= List of Caladenia species =

The following is a list of species accepted by Plants of the World Online as at November 2024: Common names are mostly those given by David L. Jones, or sometimes (especially for more recently described species or subspecies), those used by Andrew Brown.

- Caladenia abbreviata Hopper & A.P.Br. - coastal spider orchid
- Caladenia actensis D.L.Jones & M.A.Clem. - Canberra spider orchid
- Caladenia × aestantha Hopper & A.P.Br. – summer spider orchid
- Caladenia alata R.Br. - fairy caladenia
- Caladenia alpina R.S.Rogers - alpine caladenia
- Caladenia ambusta A.P.Br. & G.Brockman - Boranup spider orchid
- Caladenia amnicola D.L.Jones - Bundarra spider orchid
- Caladenia amoena D.L.Jones - charming spider orchid
- Caladenia ampla (D.L.Jones) G.N.Backh. - dainty spider orchid
- Caladenia amplexans A.S.George
- Caladenia ancylosa (D.L.Jones) G.N.Backh. - Genoa spider orchid
- Caladenia angustata Lindl. - white caps
- Caladenia anthracina D.L.Jones - black-lipped spider orchid
- Caladenia aperta (Hopper & A.P.Br.) M.A.Clem.
- Caladenia applanata Hopper & A.P.Br.
  - Caladenia applanata Hopper & A.P.Br.subsp. applanata - broad-lipped spider orchid
  - Caladenia applanata subsp. erubescens Hopper & A.P.Br. - rose spider orchid
- Caladenia arenaria Fitzg. - sand-hill spider orchid
- Caladenia arenicola Hopper & A.P.Br. - carousel spider orchid
- Caladenia argocalla D.L.Jones - white beauty spider orchid
- Caladenia armata (D.L.Jones) G.N.Backh.
- Caladenia arrecta Hopper & A.P.Br. - reaching spider orchid
- Caladenia ashbyae (Hopper & A.P.Br.) M.A.Clem.
- Caladenia atradenia D.L.Jones, Molloy & M.A.Clem. - bronze fingers (N.Z.)
- Caladenia atrata D.L.Jones - dark caladenia
- Caladenia atrochila D.L.Jones
- Caladenia atroclavia D.L.Jones & M.A.Clem. - black-clubbed spider orchid
- Caladenia atrovespa (D.L.Jones) G.N.Backh. - thin-clubbed mantis orchid
- Caladenia attenuata (Brinsley) D.L.Jones - Duramana fingers
- Caladenia attingens Hopper & A.P.Br. - mantis orchids
  - Caladenia attingens subsp. attingens Hopper & A.P.Br. - forest mantis orchid
  - Caladenia attingens subsp. effusa A.P.Br. & G.Brockman - granite mantis orchid
  - Caladenia attingens subsp. gracillima Hopper & A.P.Br. - small mantis orchid
- Caladenia audasii R.S.Rogers - McIvor spider-orchid
- Caladenia aurantiaca (R.S.Rogers) Rupp orange-tip caladenia
- Caladenia aurulenta (D.L.Jones) R.J.Bates
- Caladenia australis G.W.Carr - southern spider-orchid
- Caladenia barbarella Hopper & A.P.Br. - small dragon orchid
- Caladenia barbarossa Rchb.f. - common dragon orchid
- Caladenia bartlettii (Hatch) D.L.Jones (N.Z.)
- Caladenia behrii Schltdl. - pink-lipped spider orchid
- Caladenia bicalliata R.S.Rogers
  - Caladenia bicalliata R.S.Rogers subsp. bicalliata - dwarf limestone spider orchid
  - Caladenia bicalliata subsp. cleistogama Hopper & A.P.Br. - sandhill spider orchid
- Caladenia bigeminata A.P.Br. & G.Brockman
- Caladenia boweri D.L.Jones Mt Canobolas spider orchid
- Caladenia brachyscapa G.W.Carr - short spider-orchid
- Caladenia branwhitei (D.L.Jones) G.N.Backh.
- Caladenia brevisura Hopper & A.P.Br. - short-sepalled spider orchid
- Caladenia brownii Hopper & A.P.Br. - karri spider orchid
- Caladenia brumalis D.L.Jones - winter spider orchid
- Caladenia bruniella (R.J.Bates) R.J.Bates
- Caladenia brunonis (Endl.) Rchb.f.
- Caladenia bryceana R.S.Rogers
  - Caladenia bryceana R.S.Rogers subsp. bryceana - dwarf spider orchid
  - Caladenia bryceana subsp. cracens Hopper & A.P.Br. - northern dwarf spider orchid
- Caladenia busselliana Hopper & A.P.Br. - Bussell's spider orchid
- Caladenia cadyi (D.L.Jones) G.N.Backh.
- Caladenia caerulea R.Br.
- Caladenia caesarea (Domin) M.A.Clem. & Hopper
  - Caladenia caesarea (Domin) M.A.Clem. & Hopper subsp. caesarea - mustard spider orchid
  - Caladenia caesarea subsp. maritima M.A.Clem. & Hopper - cape spider orchid
  - Caladenia caesarea subsp. transiens M.A.Clem. & Hopper - dwarf mustard spider orchid
- Caladenia cairnsiana F.Muell. - zebra orchid
- Caladenia × cala Hopper & A.P.Br.
- Caladenia calcicola G.W.Carr - Bats Ridges spider orchid
- Caladenia callitrophila D.L.Jones - Berrigan spider orchid
- Caladenia calyciformis (R.S.Rogers) Hopper & A.P.Br.
- Caladenia campbellii D.L.Jones - thick-stem caladenia
- Caladenia campestris (R.J.Bates) R.J.Bates
- Caladenia capillata (Tate) D.L.Jones - white daddy long legs, wispy spider orchid
- Caladenia cardiochila Tate - heart-lip spider-orchid
- Caladenia carnea R.Br. - pink fingers orchid
- Caladenia catenata (Sm.) Druce - white caladenia, white fingers and lady's fingers
- Caladenia caudata Nicholls - tailed spider orchid
- Caladenia chamaephylla D.L.Jones - redleaf fingers
- Caladenia chapmanii Hopper & A.P.Br. - Chapman's spider orchid
- Caladenia × eludens Hopper & A.P.Br.
- Caladenia chlorostyla D.L.Jones, Molloy & M.A.Clem. (N.Z.)
- Caladenia christineae Hopper & A.P.Br. - Christine's spider orchid
- Caladenia citrina Hopper & A.P.Br. - Margaret River spider orchid
- Caladenia clarkiae D.L.Jones - pink caps
- Caladenia clavescens (D.L.Jones) G.N.Backh.
- Caladenia clavigera A.Cunn. ex Lindl. - plain-lip spider-orchid
- Caladenia clavula D.L.Jones - small-clubbed spider orchid
- Caladenia cleistantha D.L.Jones - closed caladenia
- Caladenia × coactescens Hopper & A.P.Br.
- Caladenia coactilis D.L.Jones - thick fingers
- Caladenia colorata D.L.Jones - coloured spider-orchid, small western spider-orchid, painted spider-orchid
- Caladenia concinna (Rupp) D.L.Jones & M.A.Clem. - neat spider orchid
- Caladenia concolor Fitzg. - crimson spider orchid
- Caladenia conferta D.L.Jones - crowded spider orchid, coast spider orchid
- Caladenia congesta R.Br. - black-tongue caladenia
- Caladenia corynephora A.S.George - club-lipped spider orchid
- Caladenia cracens D.L.Jones 1996 - elegant caladenia
- Caladenia crebra A.S.George - Arrowsmith spider orchid
- Caladenia cremna (D.L.Jones) G.N.Backh. - Don's spider orchid
- Caladenia cretacea (D.L.Jones) G.N.Backh. - Stuart Mill spider orchid
- Caladenia cristata R.S.Rogers - crested clown orchid
- Caladenia cruciformis D.L.Jones - crucifix spider orchid
- Caladenia cruscula Hopper & A.P.Br. - reclining spider orchid
- Caladenia cucullata Fitzg. - hooded caladenia
- Caladenia curtisepala D.L.Jones - short-hooded fingers
- Caladenia decora Hopper & A.P.Br. - Esperance king spider orchid
- Caladenia denticulata Lindl.
  - Caladenia denticulata Lindl. subsp. denticulata - yellow spider orchid
  - Caladenia denticulata subsp. albicans A.P.Br. & G.Brockman - alabaster spider orchid
  - Caladenia denticulata subsp. rubella A.P.Br. & G.Brockman - clumped spider orchid
- Caladenia dienema D.L.Jones - windswept spider-orchid
- Caladenia dilatata R.Br. - green-comb spider-orchid
- Caladenia dimidia Hopper & A.P.Br. chameleon spider orchid
- Caladenia dimorpha Fitzg. - spicy caps
- Caladenia discoidea Lindl. - bee orchid, dancing spider orchid
- Caladenia dorrienii Domin - Cossack spider orchid
- Caladenia dorrigoensis D.L.Jones & L.M.Copel.
- Caladenia douglasiorum (D.L.Jones) G.N.Backh.
- Caladenia doutchiae O.H.Sarg. 1921 - purple-veined clown orchid
- Caladenia drakeoides Hopper & A.P.Br. - hinged dragon orchid
- Caladenia drummondii Benth. - winter spider orchid
- Caladenia dundasiae Hopper & A.P.Br. - Patricia's spider orchid
- Caladenia echidnachila Nicholls - fawn spider orchid
- Caladenia elegans Hopper & A.P.Br. - elegant spider orchid
- Caladenia × eludens Hopper & A.P.Br.
- Caladenia emarginata (Lindl.) Rchb.f. - pink enamel orchid
- Caladena × enigma Hopper & A.P.Br.
- Caladenia ensata Nicholls - stumpy spider orchid
- Caladenia × ensigera (D.L.Jones) R.J.Bates - large bayonet spider orchid
- Caladenia × ericksoniae Nicholls
- Caladenia × erminea Hopper & A.P.Br.
- Caladenia erythrochila Hopper & A.P.Br. Lake Muir spider orchid
- Caladenia erythronema A.P.Br. & G.Brockman - red thread spider orchid
- Caladenia evanescens Hopper & A.P.Br. - semaphore spider orchid
- Caladenia excelsa Hopper & A.P.Br. - giant spider orchid
- Caladenia exilis Hopper & A.P.Br.
  - Caladenia exilis Hopper & A.P.Br. subsp. exilis - salt lake spider orchid
  - Caladenia exilis subsp. vanleeuwenii Hopper & A.P.Br. - Moora spider orchid
- Caladenia × exoleta Hopper & A.P.Br.
- Caladenia × exserta Hopper & A.P.Br.
- Caladenia exstans Hopper & A.P.Br. - pointing spider orchid
- Caladenia falcata (Nicholls) M.A.Clem. & Hopper - fringed mantis orchid
- Caladenia ferruginea Nicholls – rusty spider orchid
- Caladenia filamentosa R.Br. - daddy-long-legs
- Caladenia filifera Lindl. - blood spider orchid
- Caladenia fitzgeraldii Rupp - Fitzgerald's spider orchid
- Caladenia flaccida D.L.Jones - flaccid spider orchid, ironcaps spider orchid
- Caladenia flava R.Br.
  - Caladenia flava R.Br. subsp. flava - cowslip orchid
  - Caladenia flava subsp. maculata Hopper & A.P.Br. - Kalbarri cowslip orchid
  - Caladenia flava subsp. sylvestris Hopper & A.P.Br. - karri cowslip orchid
- Caladenia flavovirens G.W.Carr - summer spider-orchid
- Caladenia flindersica (D.L.Jones) R.J.Bates
- Caladenia fluvialis A.P.Br. & G.Brockman - Brookton Highway spider orchid
- Caladenia footeana Hopper & A.P.Br. - crimson spider orchid
- Caladenia formosa G.W.Carr - large crimson spider orchid, elegant spider orchid
- Caladenia fragrans (Hopper & A.P.Br.) M.A.Clem.
- Caladenia fragrantissima D.L.Jones & G.W.Carr - scented spider orchid
- Caladenia fuliginosa (D.L.Jones) R.J.Bates
- Caladenia fulva G.W.Carr - tawny spider orchid
- Caladenia fuscata (Rchb.f.) M.A.Clem. & D.L.Jones - dusky fingers orchid
- Caladenia fuscolutescens Hopper & A.P.Br. - ochre spider orchid
- Caladenia gardneri Hopper & A.P.Br. - cherry spider orchid
- Caladenia gemmata Lindl. – blue china orchid
- Caladenia georgei Hopper & A.P.Br. - tuart spider orchid
- Caladenia gertrudae Ostenf. pale china orchid
- Caladenia gladiolata R.S.Rogers - small bayonet spider orchid, smelly socks
- Caladenia gracilis R.Br. - musky caps
- Caladenia gracillima (Rupp) D.L.Jones - pretty fingers
- Caladenia graminifolia A.S.George - grass-leaved spider orchid
- Caladenia grampiana (D.L.Jones) G.N.Backh. - Grampians spider orchid
- Caladenia graniticola (Hopper & A.P.Br.) Hopper & A.P.Br. - Pingaring spider orchid
- Caladenia granitora Hopper & A.P.Br. - granite spider orchid
- Caladenia harringtoniae Hopper & A.P.Br. - pink spider orchid
- Caladenia hastata (Nicholls) Rupp Mellblom's spider-orchid
- Caladenia heberleana Hopper & A.P.Br. - Heberle's spider orchid
- Caladenia helvina D.L.Jones - summer spider orchid
- Caladenia hiemalis Hopper & A.P.Br. - dwarf common spider orchid
- Caladenia hesperia D.L.Jones & M.A.Clem.
- Caladenia hildae Pescott & Nicholls - golden caladenia, honey caladenia
- Caladenia hillmanii D.L.Jones - purple-heart fingers
- Caladenia hirta Lindl.
  - Caladenia hirta Lindl. subsp. hirta - candy orchid
  - Caladenia hirta subsp. rosea Hopper & A.P.Br. - pink candy orchid
- Caladenia hoffmanii Hopper & A.P.Br. - Hoffman's spider orchid
- Caladenia × hopperi J.M.H.Shaw
- Caladenia hopperiana A.P.Br., R.D.Phillips & G.Brockman
- Caladenia horistes Hopper & A.P.Br. - cream spider orchid
- Caladenia huegelii Rchb.f. - grand spider orchid
- Caladenia × hypata Hopper & A.P.Br.
- Caladenia × idiastes Hopper & A.P.Br.
- Caladenia incensum Hopper & A.P.Br. - glistening spider orchid
- Caladenia incrassata Hopper & A.P.Br. - puppet clown orchid
- Caladenia infundibularis A.S.George - funnel-web spider orchid
- Caladenia insularis G.W.Carr French Island spider-orchid
- Caladenia integra E.Coleman - smooth-lipped spider orchid
- Caladenia interanea D.L.Jones & R.J.Bates
- Caladenia interjacens Hopper & A.P.Br. - Walpole spider orchid
- Caladenia × intermedia (Fitzg.) M.A.Clem. & D.L.Jones
- Caladenia intuta D.L.Jones & R.J.Bates
- Caladenia iridescens R.S.Rogers -bronze caps
- Caladenia isolata (R.J.Bates) D.L.Jones & M.A.Clem.
- Caladenia lateritica K.W.Dixon & Christenh. – white primrose orchid
- Caladenia latifolia R.Br. - pink fairies
- Caladenia × lavandulacea R.S.Rogers
- Caladenia leptochila Fitzg.
  - Caladenia leptochila subsp. dentata (D.L.Jones) R.J.Bates - toothed spider orchid
  - Caladenia leptochila Fitzg. subsp. leptochila - narrow-lipped spider orchid
- Caladenia leptoclavia D.L.Jones
- Caladenia leucochila A.P.Br., R.Phillips & G.Brockman
- Caladenia lindleyana (Rchb.f.) M.A.Clem. & D.L.Jones - Lindley's spider orchid
- Caladenia littoricola R.J.Bates
- Caladenia lobata Fitzg. - butterfly orchid
- Caladenia lodgeana Hopper & A.P.Br. - Lodge's spider orchid
- Caladenia longicauda Lindl.
  - Caladenia longicauda subsp. albella Hopper & A.P.Br. - small-lipped white spider orchid
  - Caladenia longicauda subsp. australora Hopper & A.P.Br. - southern white spider orchid
  - Caladenia longicauda subsp. borealis Hopper & A.P.Br. - daddy-long-legs spider orchid
  - Caladenia longicauda subsp. calcigena Hopper & A.P.Br. coastal white spider orchid
  - Caladenia longicauda subsp. clivicola Hopper & A.P.Br. - Darling Scarp white spider orchid
  - Caladenia longicauda subsp. crassa Hopper & A.P.Br. - Esperance white spider orchid
  - Caladenia longicauda subsp. eminens (Domin) Hopper & A.P.Br. - stark white spider orchid
  - Caladenia longicauda subsp. extrema A.P.Br. & G.Brockman. - late white spider orchid
  - Caladenia longicauda subsp. insularis Hopper & A.P.Br. ex A.P.Br. & G.Brockman - island white spider orchid
  - Caladenia longicauda subsp. longicauda - large white spider orchid
  - Caladenia longicauda subsp. merrittii Hopper & A.P.Br. - Merritt's white spider orchid
  - Caladenia longicauda subsp. minima A.P.Br. & G.Brockman - little white spider orchid
  - Caladenia longicauda subsp. redacta Hopper & A.P.Br. - tangled white spider orchid
  - Caladenia longicauda subsp. rigidula Hopper & A.P.Br. - rigid white spider orchid, island white spider orchid
- Caladenia longiclavata E.Coleman - clubbed spider orchid
- Caladenia longifimbriata Hopper & A.P.Br. - fringed spider orchid
- Caladenia lorea Hopper & A.P.Br. - blushing spider orchid
- Caladenia lowanensis G.W.Carr - Wimmera spider-orchid
- Caladenia luteola Hopper & A.P.Br.
- Caladenia lyallii Hook.f.
- Caladenia macroclavia D.L.Jones - brown bayonets, large-club spider orchid
- Caladenia macrostylis Fitzg. - leaping spider orchid
- Caladenia magniclavata Nicholls - big clubbed spider orchid
- Caladenia magnifica (Nicholls) D.L.Jones & G.W.Carr - magnificent spider orchid
- Caladenia major (R.Br.) Rchb.f.
- Caladenia marginata Lindl. - white fairy orchid
- Caladenia maritima D.L.Jones - coastal fingers
- Caladenia melanema Hopper & A.P.Br. - ballerina orchid
- Caladenia mentiens D.L.Jones – lesser fingers
- Caladenia meridionalis Hopper & A.P.Br. - south coast spider orchid
- Caladenia mesocera Hopper & A.P.Br. - narrow-lipped dragon orchid
- Caladenia microchila Hopper & A.P.Br. - western wispy spider orchid
- Caladenia minor Hook.f. - white fingers (N.Z.)
- Caladenia minorata M.A.Clem.
- Caladenia montana G.W.Carr - mountain spider orchid
- Caladenia moschata (D.L.Jones) G.N.Backh.
- Caladenia multiclavia Rchb.f. - lazy spider orchid
- Caladenia multiplex A.P.Br. & R.D.Phillips
- Caladenia nana Endl. in J.G.C.Lehmann
  - Caladenia nana Endl. subsp. nana - little pink fan orchid
  - Caladenia nana subsp. unita (W.Fitzg.) Hopper & A.P.Br. - pink fan orchid
- Caladenia necrophylla D.L.Jones - late green-comb spider orchid
- Caladenia nikulinskyae Hopper & A.P.Br.
- Caladenia nivalis Hopper & A.P.Br. - crystalline spider orchid
- Caladenia nobilis Hopper & A.P.Br. - noble spider orchid
- Caladenia nothofageti D.L.Jones, Molloy & M.A.Clem. (N.Z.)
- Caladenia occidentalis Hopper & A.P.Br. - ruby spider orchid
- Caladenia oenochila G.W.Carr 1991 - red-lipped spider orchid, wine-lipped spider-orchid
- Caladenia oreophila (D.L.Jones) G.N.Backh.
- Caladenia orestes (D.L.Jones) G.N.Backh.
- Caladenia orientalis (G.W.Carr) Hopper & A.P.Br. - eastern spider orchid
- Caladenia ornata (Nicholls) D.L.Jones - ornate pink fingers
- Caladenia osmera (D.L.Jones) G.N.Backh. - pungent spider orchid
- Caladenia ovata R.S.Rogers - Kangaroo Island spider orchid
- Caladenia pachychila Hopper & A.P.Br. - dwarf zebra orchid
- Caladenia pallida Lindl. - rosy spider orchid
- Caladenia paludosa Hopper & A.P.Br. - swamp spider orchid
- Caladenia paradoxa Hopper & A.P.Br. ironcaps spider orchid
- Caladenia parva G.W.Carr - small spider orchid
- Caladenia patersonii R.Br. - Paterson's spider orchid
- Caladenia pectinata R.S.Rogers - king spider orchid
- Caladenia peisleyi (D.L.Jones) G.N.Backh.
- Caladenia pendens Hopper & A.P.Br.
  - Caladenia pendens Hopper & A.P.Br. subsp. pendens - pendant spider orchid
  - Caladenia pendens subsp. talboti Hopper & A.P.Br. Talbot's spider orchid
- Caladenia perangusta A.P.Br. & G.Brockman - Boyup Brook spider orchid
- Caladenia petrensis A.P.Br. & G.Brockman - rock spider orchid
- Caladenia phaeoclavia D.L.Jones - brown-clubbed spider orchid
- Caladenia pholcoidea Hopper & A.P.Br.
  - Caladenia pholcoidea subsp. augustensis Hopper & A.P.Br. - Augustus spider orchid
  - Caladenia pholcoidea Hopper & A.P.Br. subsp. pholcoidea - Albany spider orchid
- Caladenia picta (Nicholls) M.A.Clem. & D.L.Jones - painted fingers
- Caladenia pilotensis D.L.Jones – Mount Pilot spider orchid
- Caladenia plicata Fitzg. crab-lipped spider orchid
- Caladenia pluvialis A.P.Br. & G.Brockman - Yuna spider orchid
- Caladenia polychroma Hopper & A.P.Br. - Joseph's spider orchid
- Caladenia postea Hopper & A.P.Br. dark-tipped spider orchid
- Caladenia procera Hopper & A.P.Br. - Carbunup spider orchid
- Caladenia prolata D.L.Jones - long-leaf fingers
- Caladenia pulchra Hopper & A.P.Br. - slender spider orchid
- Caladenia pumila R.S.Rogers - dwarf spider-orchid
- Caladenia pusilla W.M.Curtis - tiny fingers
- Caladenia pygmaea (R.S.Rogers) R.J.Bates
- Caladenia quadrifaria D.L.Jones - large pink fingers
- Caladenia radialis R.S.Rogers - drooping spider orchid
- Caladenia radiata Nicholls - ray spider orchid
- Caladenia remota Hopper & A.P.Br.
  - Caladenia remota subsp. parva Hopper & A.P.Br. Perenjori spider orchid
  - Caladenia remota Hopper & A.P.Br. subsp. remota - outback spider orchid
- Caladenia reptans Lindl.
  - Caladenia reptans subsp. impensa Hopper & A.P.Br. - pale pink fairies
  - Caladenia reptans Lindl. subsp. reptans - little pink fairies
- Caladenia × resupina Hopper & A.P.Br.
- Caladenia reticulata Fitzg. - netted Caladenia
- Caladenia rhomboidiformis (E.Coleman) M.A.Clem. & Hopper - diamond spider orchid
- Caladenia richardsiorum D.L.Jones - Richard's spider orchid, robe spider orchid
- Caladenia rigens D.L.Jones
- Caladenia rigida R.S.Rogers - stiff spider orchid
- Caladenia rileyi D.L.Jones - Gillenbah spider orchid
- Caladenis riparia R.J.Bates
- Caladenia robinsonii G.W.Carr - Frankston spider orchid
- Caladenia roei Benth. - common clown orchid
- Caladenia rosea K.W.Dixon & Christenh.
- Caladenia rosella G.W.Carr - rosella spider orchid
- Caladenia saccharata Rchb.f.
- Caladenia saggicola D.L.Jones - Sagg spider orchid
- Caladenia sanguinea D.L.Jones
- Caladenia saxatilis D.L.Jones & R.J.Bates - rancid spider orchid
- Caladenia saxicola A.P.Br. & G.Brockman - banded ironstone spider orchid
- Caladenia septuosa D.L.Jones - Koppio spider orchid
- Caladenia sericea Lindl.
- Caladenia serotina Hopper & A.P.Br. - Christmas spider orchid
- Caladenia sigmoidea R.S.Rogers
- Caladenia speciosa Hopper & A.P.Br. - sandplain white spider orchid
- Caladenia × spectabilis Hopper & A.P.Br.
- Caladenia splendens Hopper & A.P.Br. - splendid spider orchid
- Caladenia startiorum Hopper & A.P.Br. - Start's spider orchid
- Caladenia stellata D.L.Jones - starry spider orchid
- Caladenia straminichila A.P.Br. & G.Brockman - Tenterden yellow spider orchid
- Caladenia stricta (R.J.Bates) R.J.Bates - upright spider orchid
- Caladenia strigosa (D.L.Jones) R.J.Bates
- Caladenia subglabriphylla (R.J.Bates) M.A.Clem.
- Caladenia subtilis D.L.Jones - delicate spider orchid
- Caladenia × suffusa Hopper & A.P.Br.
- Caladenia swartsiorum A.P.Br. & G.Brockman - Island Point spider orchid
- Caladenia sylvicola D.L.Jones - forest fingers
- Caladenia tensa G.W.Carr - rigid spider orchid
- Caladenia tentaculata Schltdl. - eastern mantis orchid
- Caladenia tessellata Fitzg. - thick-lip spider orchid
- Caladenia testacea R.Br. - honey caps
- Caladenia thinicola Hopper & A.P.Br. - Scott River spider orchid
- Caladenia thysanochila G.W.Carr - peninsula spider orchid
- Caladenia tonellii D.L.Jones - robust fingers
- Caladenia toxochila Tate - bow-lip spider orchid
- Caladenia transitoria D.L.Jones - green caps
- Caladenia × triangularis R.S.Rogers
- Caladenia × tryphera Hopper & A.P.Br.
- Caladenia turneri Kosky
- Caladenia uliginosa A.S.George
  - Caladenia uliginosa subsp. candicans Hopper & A.P.Br. - northern darting spider orchid
  - Caladenia uliginosa subsp. patulens Hopper & A.P.Br. - frail spider orchid
  - Caladenia uliginosa A.S.George subsp. uliginosa - dainty spider orchid
- Caladenia ultima Hopper & A.P.Br. - late spider orchid
- Caladenia ustulata (D.L.Jones) G.N.Backh.
- Caladenia valida (Nicholls) M.A.Clem. & D.L.Jones - robust spider orchid
- Caladenia validinervia Hopper & A.P.Br. ex A.P.Br. & G.Brockman - Lake Muir spider orchid
- Caladenia × variabilis Nicholls
- Caladenia variegata Colenso (N.Z.)
- Caladenia venusta G.W.Carr - graceful spider orchid
- Caladenia verrucosa G.W.Carr - mallee spider orchid
- Caladenia versicolor G.W.Carr - candy spider orchid
- Caladenia villosissima (G.W.Carr) Hopper & A.P.Br. - hairy spider orchid
- Caladenia viridescens Hopper & A.P.Br. - Dunsborough spider orchid
- Caladenia voigtii Hopper & A.P.Br. - Mohawk clown orchid
- Caladenia vulgaris D.L.Jones - summer fingers
- Caladenia wanosa A.S.George - Kalbarri spider orchid
- Caladenia whiteheadii (D.L.Jones) G.N.Backh.
- Caladenia williamsiae Hopper & A.P.Br. - Judy's spider orchid
- Caladenia winfieldii Hopper & A.P.Br. - majestic spider orchid
- Caladenia woolcockiorum D.L.Jones - Woolcock's spider orchid
- Caladenia xantha Hopper & A.P.Br. - primrose spider orchid
- Caladenia xanthochila D.Beards. & C.Beards - yellow-lip spider orchid
- Caladenia xantholeuca D.L.Jones - Flinders fingers
- Caladenia zephyra (D.L.Jones) R.J.Bates

Plants of the World Online also lists the following species of Caladenia:

- Caladenia amplexans, known as Cyanicula amplexans by the Australian Plant Census
- Caladenia aperta, known as Cyanicula aperta by the Australian Plant Census
- Caladenia ashybae, known as Cyanicula ashbyae by the Australian Plant Census
- Caladenia brunonis, known as Elythranthera brunonis by the Australian Plant Census
- Caladenia caerulea, known as Cyanicula caerulea by the Australian Plant Census
- Caladenia emarginata, known as Elythranthera emarginata by the Australian Plant Census
- Caldenia ericksonella known as Ericksonella saccharata by the Australian Plant Census
- Caladenia fragrans, known as Cyanicula fragrans by the Australian Plant Census
- Caladenia gemmata, known as Cyanicula gemmata by the Australian Plant Census
- Caladenia gertrudae, known as Cyanicula gertrudae by the Australian Plant Census
- Caladenia ixioides, known as Cyanicula ixioides by the Australian Plant Census
- Caladenia lateritica, a synonym of Caladenia flava subsp. sylvestris by the Australian Plant Census
- Caladenia major, known as Glossodia major by the Australian Plant Census
- Caladenia minorata, known as Glossodia minor by the Australian Plant Census
- Caladenia nikulinskyae known as Cyanicula nikulinskyae by the Australian Plant Census
- Caladenia rosea, a synonym of Caladenia × spectabilis by the Australian Plant Census
- Caladenia sericea, known as Cyanicula sericea by the Australian Plant Census
