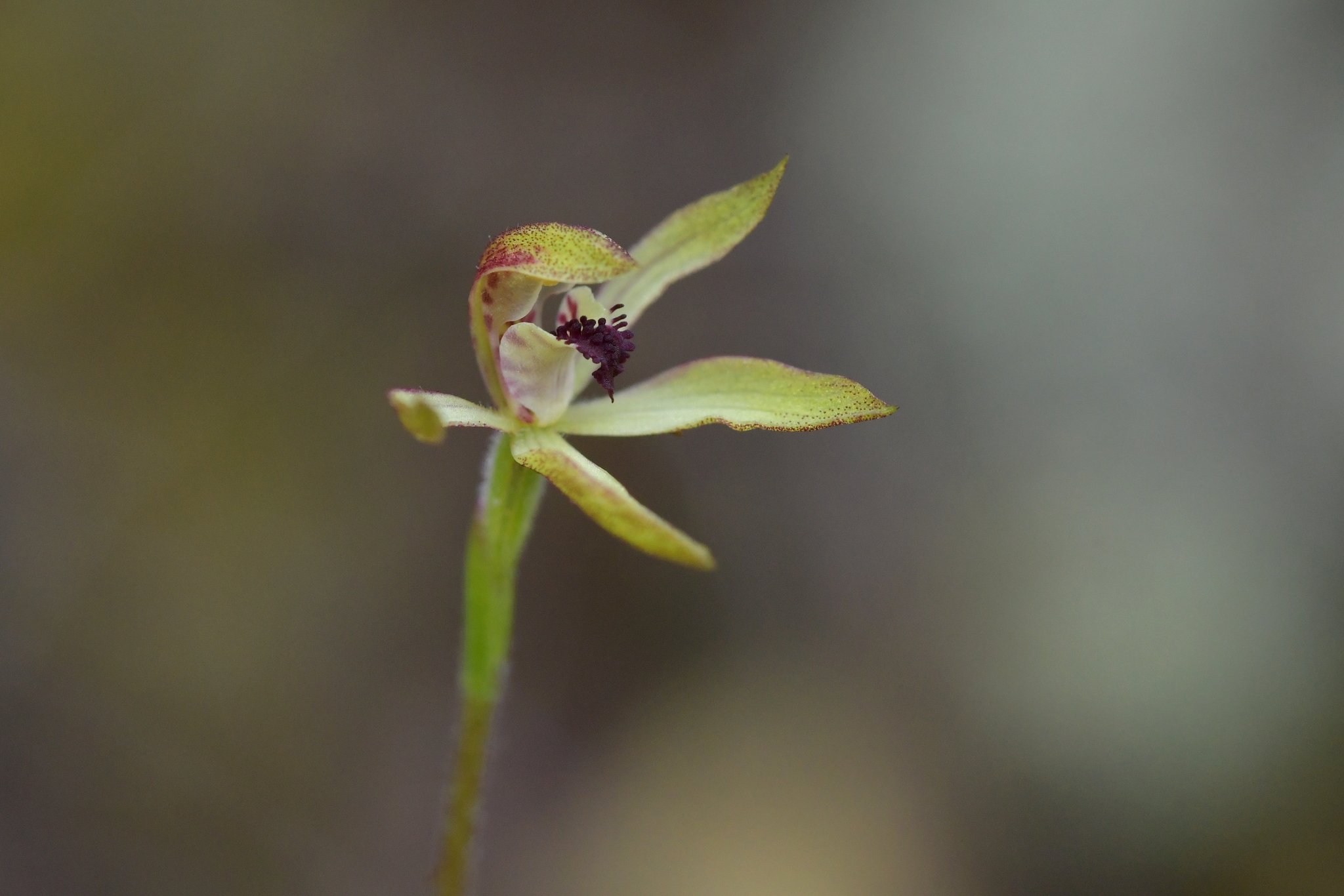

Conservation status
- Nationally Endangered (NZ TCS)

Scientific classification
- Kingdom: Plantae
- Clade: Tracheophytes
- Clade: Angiosperms
- Clade: Monocots
- Order: Asparagales
- Family: Orchidaceae
- Subfamily: Orchidoideae
- Tribe: Diurideae
- Genus: Caladenia
- Species: C. atradenia

Binomial name
- Caladenia atradenia D.L.Jones, Molloy & M.A.Clem.

Synonyms
- Stegostyla atradenia D.L.Jones, Molloy & M.A.Clem.) D.L.Jones & M.A.Clem.; Caladenia carnea f. calliniger Hatch

= Caladenia atradenia =

Bronze fingers

Species of orchid

Caladenia atradenia, commonly known as bronze fingers, is a plant in the orchid family Orchidaceae and is endemic to New Zealand. It is a ground orchid with a thin, hairy leaf and a thin wiry stem bearing one or two dark green or greenish red flowers with maroon or magenta markings.

== Description ==
Caladenia atradenia is a terrestrial, perennial, deciduous, herb, sometimes solitary or in groups of up to ten individuals. It has an underground tuber and a single hairy, narrow linear leaf, 10–16 cm (4–6 in) long, 1–3 mm (0.04–0.1 in) wide and dark to reddish green.

One, sometimes two flowers 20 mm (0.8 in) in diameter are borne on a thin, hairy, reddish-green, wiry spike, 10–30 cm (4–10 in) high. The flowers are dark to reddish-green, often with dark magenta markings. The dorsal sepal curves forward, forming a hood over the column. It is 7–10 mm (0.3–0.4 in) long, 2–3 mm (0.08–0.1 in) wide and a narrow egg-shape with a pointed tip. The lateral sepals are 7–11 mm (0.3–0.4 in) long, 2–3 mm (0.08–0.1 in) wide and are lance-shaped but curved. The petals are 7–10 mm (0.3–0.4 in) long, about 2 mm (0.08 in) wide and sickle-shaped. The labellum is white with purple bars, 5–6 mm (0.20–0.24 in) long, about 4 mm (0.16 in) wide when flattened, has three lobes and curves forward. The lateral lobes are about 1.5 mm (0.06 in) wide and erect. There are between four and eight pair of dark, purplish linear calli, decreasing in size towards the front along the sides of the labellum and two rows of white-stalked, dark headed calli on the mid-lobe. The column is 5–6 mm (0.20–0.24 in) long, erect and greenish with red marks and narrow wings. Flowering occurs between August and December and is followed by a hairy capsule 18–24 mm (0.7–0.9 in) long, 5–6 mm (0.20–0.24 in) wide and green with red stripes.

== Taxonomy and naming ==
Caladenia atradenia was first formally described by David Jones, Brian Molloy and Mark Clements and the description was published in The Orchadian. The specific epithet (atradenia) is from the Latin word ater meaning "black" and the ancient Greek word aden meaning "gland" referring to the blackish labellum calli.

== Distribution and habitat ==
Bronze fingers grows in poor soils, usually in thick leaf litter under shrubs in mixed conifer/broadleaved-hardwood forest but also on bare ground and in exotic pine plantations. It is found on both the North and South Islands of New Zealand.

== Conservation status ==
Under the New Zealand Threat Classification System, this species is listed as "Nationally Endangered" with the qualifiers of "Biologically Sparse", "Data Poor: Size", "Data Poor: Trend" and "Population Fragmentation".
