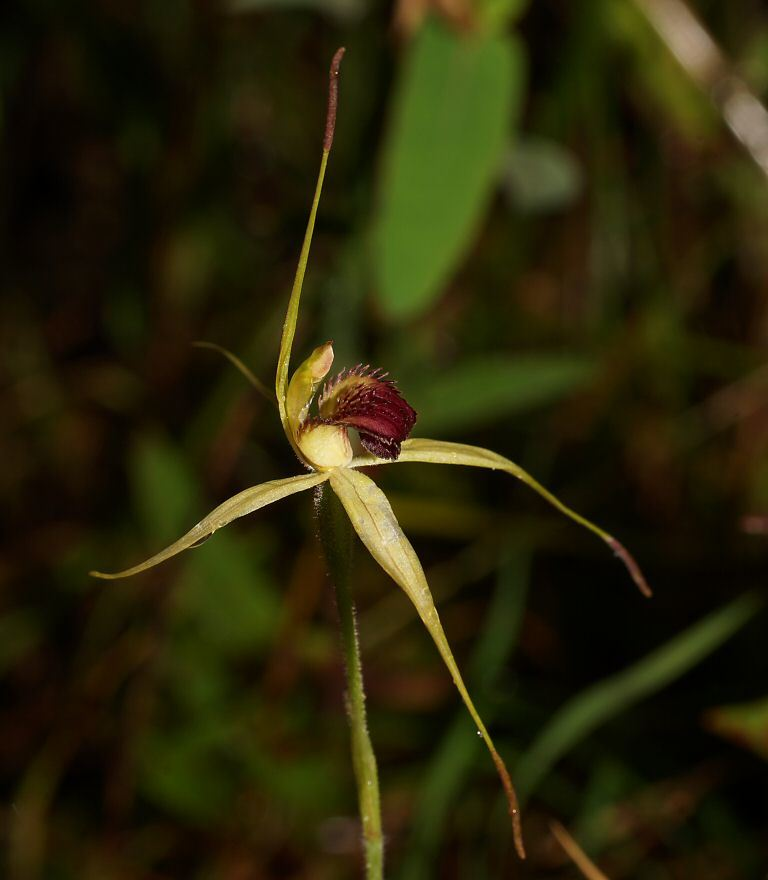

Scientific classification
- Kingdom: Plantae
- Clade: Tracheophytes
- Clade: Angiosperms
- Clade: Monocots
- Order: Asparagales
- Family: Orchidaceae
- Subfamily: Orchidoideae
- Tribe: Diurideae
- Genus: Caladenia
- Species: C. ancylosa

Binomial name
- Caladenia ancylosa (D.L.Jones) G.N.Backh.

Synonyms
- Arachnorchis ancylosa D.L.Jones

= Caladenia ancylosa =

Genoa spider orchid

Species of orchid

Caladenia ancylosa, commonly known as the Genoa spider orchid, is a plant in the orchid family Orchidaceae and is endemic to Victoria. It is a ground orchid with a single hairy leaf and a single cream-coloured flower with red markings.

== Description ==
Caladenia ancylosa is a terrestrial, perennial, deciduous, herb with an underground tuber and a single hairy leaf, 6–12 cm (2–5 in) long and 5–10 mm (0.2–0.4 in) wide.

A single flower is borne on a spike 12–25 cm (5–10 in) high. The dorsal sepal is erect, oblong to lance-shaped, 25–40 mm (1–2 in) long and about 3 mm (0.1 in) wide. It tapers near the end which terminates in a glandular structure 7–10 mm (0.3–0.4 in) long. The lateral sepals are oblong to lance-shaped, 25–40 mm (0.98–1.6 in) long, 3.5–4.5 mm (0.14–0.18 in) wide and end in a gland similar to the one on the dorsal sepal. The petals are 20–25 mm (0.8–1 in) long, about 2 mm (0.08 in) wide and taper to a point. The labellum is a broad egg-shape, curves forward, 10–13 mm (0.4–0.5 in) long and 7–9 mm (0.3–0.4 in) wide when flattened. The labellum is cream-coloured at its base but red nearer the tip. There are 7 to 10 pairs of calli along the edge of the labellum, decreasing in length towards its front. There are six rows of foot-shaped calli in the centre of the labellum, also smaller towards the tip. Flowering occurs in September and October.

== Taxonomy and naming ==
The species was first formally described by David L. Jones in 2006 and given the name Arachnorchis ancylosa. The description was published in Australian Orchid Research. In 2007, Gary N. Backhouse transferred the species to Caladenia as C. ancylosa and the change was published in The Victorian Naturalist. Jones derived the specific epithet (ancylosa) "from the Greek ancylosis, stiffening of the joints; in reference to the stiffly spreading lateral sepals and petals".

== Distribution and habitat ==
Caladenia ancylosa is only known from far east Gippsland where it grows in the shrub layer of tall open forest near Genoa.

== Conservation ==
This species is classified as "Vulnerable" by the Victorian government.
