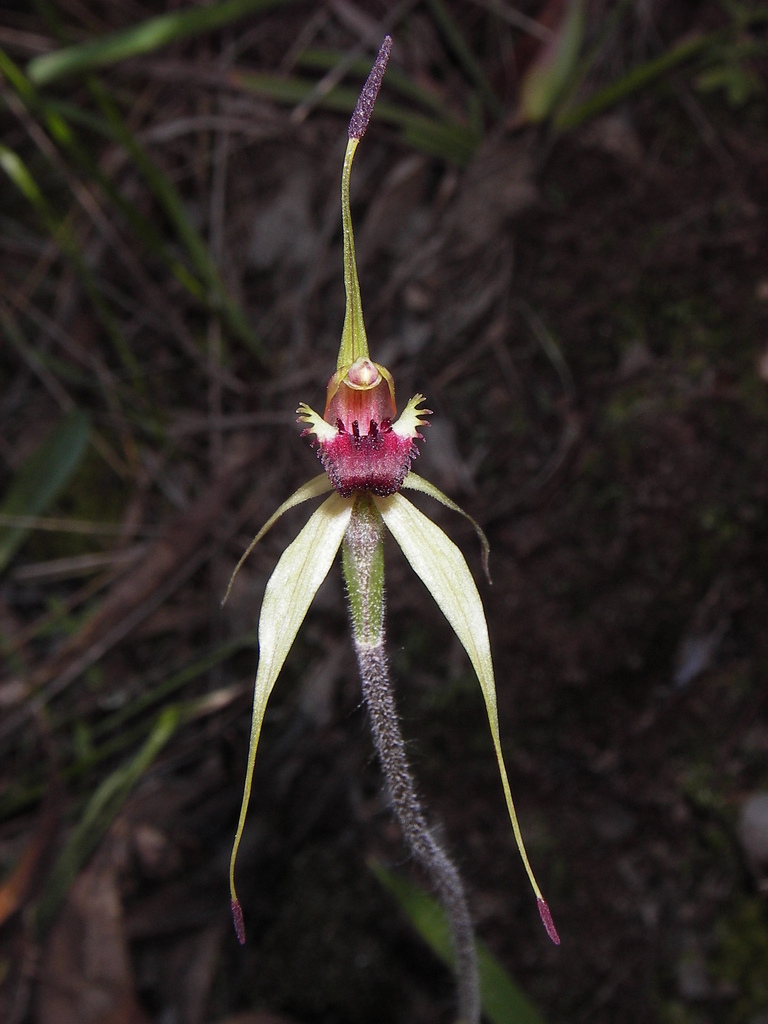
- Near Nundle

Scientific classification
- Kingdom: Plantae
- Clade: Embryophytes
- Clade: Tracheophytes
- Clade: Spermatophytes
- Clade: Angiosperms
- Clade: Monocots
- Order: Asparagales
- Family: Orchidaceae
- Subfamily: Orchidoideae
- Tribe: Diurideae
- Genus: Caladenia
- Species: C. subtilis

Binomial name
- Caladenia subtilis D.L.Jones

Synonyms
- Arachnorchis subtilis (D.L.Jones) D.L.Jones & M.A.Clem.

= Caladenia subtilis =

Delicate spider orchid

Species of orchid

Caladenia subtilis, commonly known as the delicate spider orchid, is a species of orchid endemic to New South Wales. It has a single leaf and a single greenish to cream-coloured flower with dark red tips on the sepals.

== Description ==
Caladenia subtilis is a terrestrial, perennial, deciduous, herb with an underground tuber and a single leaf, 50–110 mm (2–4 in) long and 4–6 mm (0.2–0.2 in) wide. A single greenish to cream-coloured flower 30–50 mm (1–2 in) wide is borne on a stalk 150–220 mm (6–9 in) tall. The sepals have dark red, club-like glandular tips 6–9 mm (0.2–0.4 in) long. The dorsal sepal is erect, 25–35 mm (0.98–1.4 in) long and about 2 mm (0.08 in) wide. The lateral sepals are 25–35 mm (0.98–1.4 in) long, about 4 mm (0.2 in) wide and spread apart from each other, curving downwards. The petals are 25–35 mm (0.98–1.4 in) long, about 2 mm (0.08 in) wide and arranged like the lateral sepals. The labellum is 13–15 mm (0.5–0.6 in) long, 8–9 mm (0.3–0.4 in) wide and whitish with a dark red, downcurved tip. The sides of the labellum have red teeth and there are four or six rows of dark red calli up to 1 mm (0.04 in) long, along the mid-line of the labellum. Flowering occurs from October to November.

== Taxonomy and naming ==
Caladenia subtilis was first described in 1999 by David Jones from a specimen collected in a state forest near Nowendoc and the description was published in The Orchadian. The specific epithet (subtilis) is a Latin word meaning "fine", "delicate" or "nice".

== Distribution and habitat ==
The delicate spider orchid is only known from areas near Nowendoc and Nundle where it grows in open forest.
