= Caladenia littoricola =

Scientific classification
- Kingdom: Plantae
- Clade: Tracheophytes
- Clade: Angiosperms
- Clade: Monocots
- Order: Asparagales
- Family: Orchidaceae
- Subfamily: Orchidoideae
- Tribe: Diurideae
- Genus: Caladenia
- Species: C. littoricola

Binomial name
- Caladenia littoricola R.J.Bates

Synonyms
- Petalochilus littoricola (R.J.Bates) R.J.Bates

Species of orchid

Caladenia littoricola is a plant in the orchid family Orchidaceae and is endemic to South Australia. It was first formally described in 2015 by Robert Bates who published the description in Australian Orchid Review from a specimen collected near Nora Creina. This caladenia occurs in the south-east region of South Australia. Bates derived the specific epithet from the Latin littoricola meaning "of the coast", referring to the coastal habitat of this orchid. Littoricola is a combination of the Latin littus (genitive littoris) meaning "seashore" or "beach" (alternatively written as litus, genitive litoris) and -cola meaning "-dweller".
