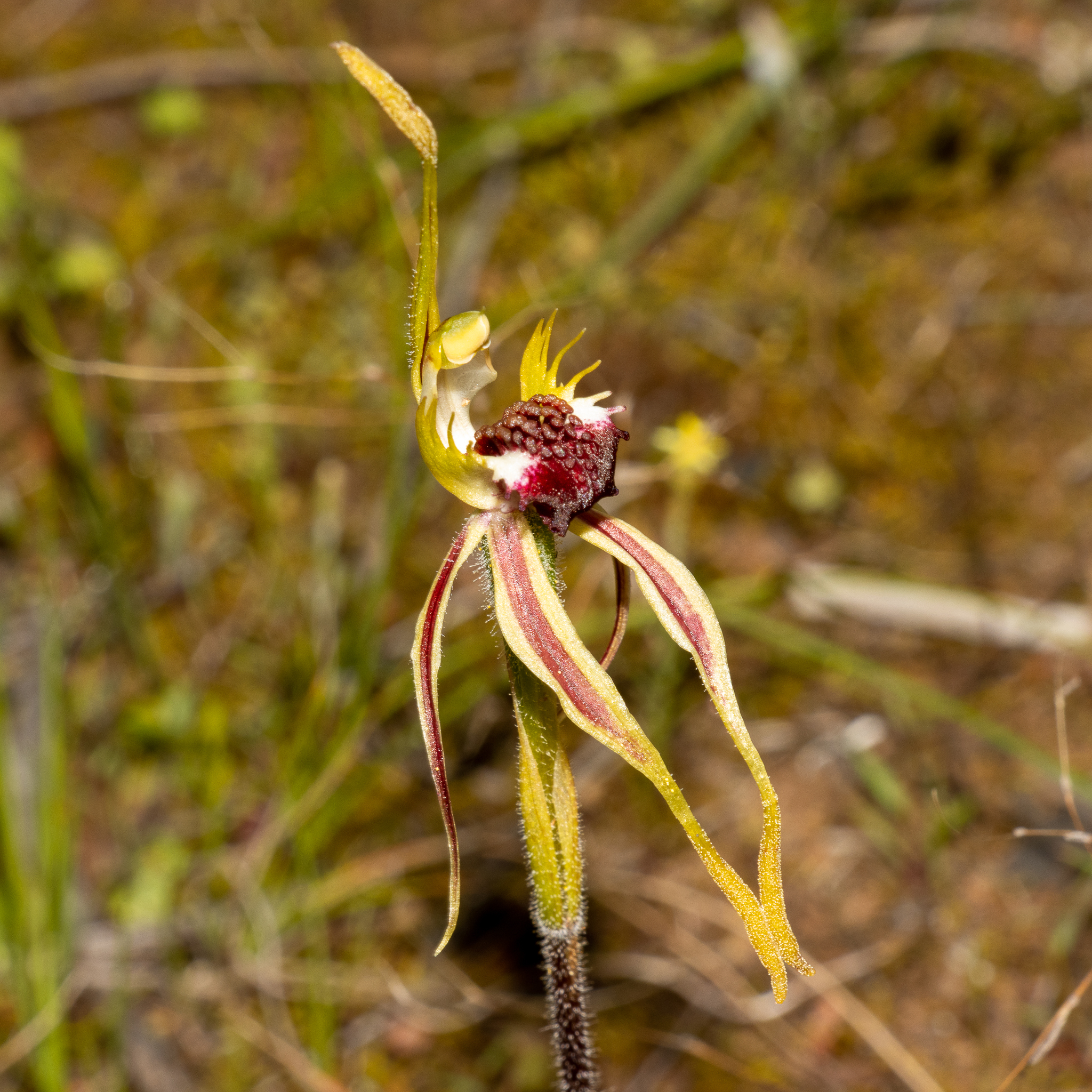

Scientific classification
- Kingdom: Plantae
- Clade: Tracheophytes
- Clade: Angiosperms
- Clade: Monocots
- Order: Asparagales
- Family: Orchidaceae
- Subfamily: Orchidoideae
- Tribe: Diurideae
- Genus: Caladenia
- Species: C. aurulenta

Binomial name
- Caladenia aurulenta (D.L.Jones) R.J.Bates

Synonyms
- Arachnorchis aurulenta D.L.Jones

= Caladenia aurulenta =

Species of orchid

Caladenia aurulenta is a species of plant in the orchid family Orchidaceae and is endemic to South Australia. It was first formally described in 2005 by David Jones, who gave it the name Arachnorchis aurulenta and published the description in The Orchadian from a specimen collected in the Gawler Ranges. In 2008, Robert Bates changed the name to Caladenia aurulenta. The specific epithet (aurulenta) is a Latin word meaning "golden", "made of gold" or "ornamented with gold". Caladenia aurulenta occurs in the northern part of the Eyre Peninsula.
