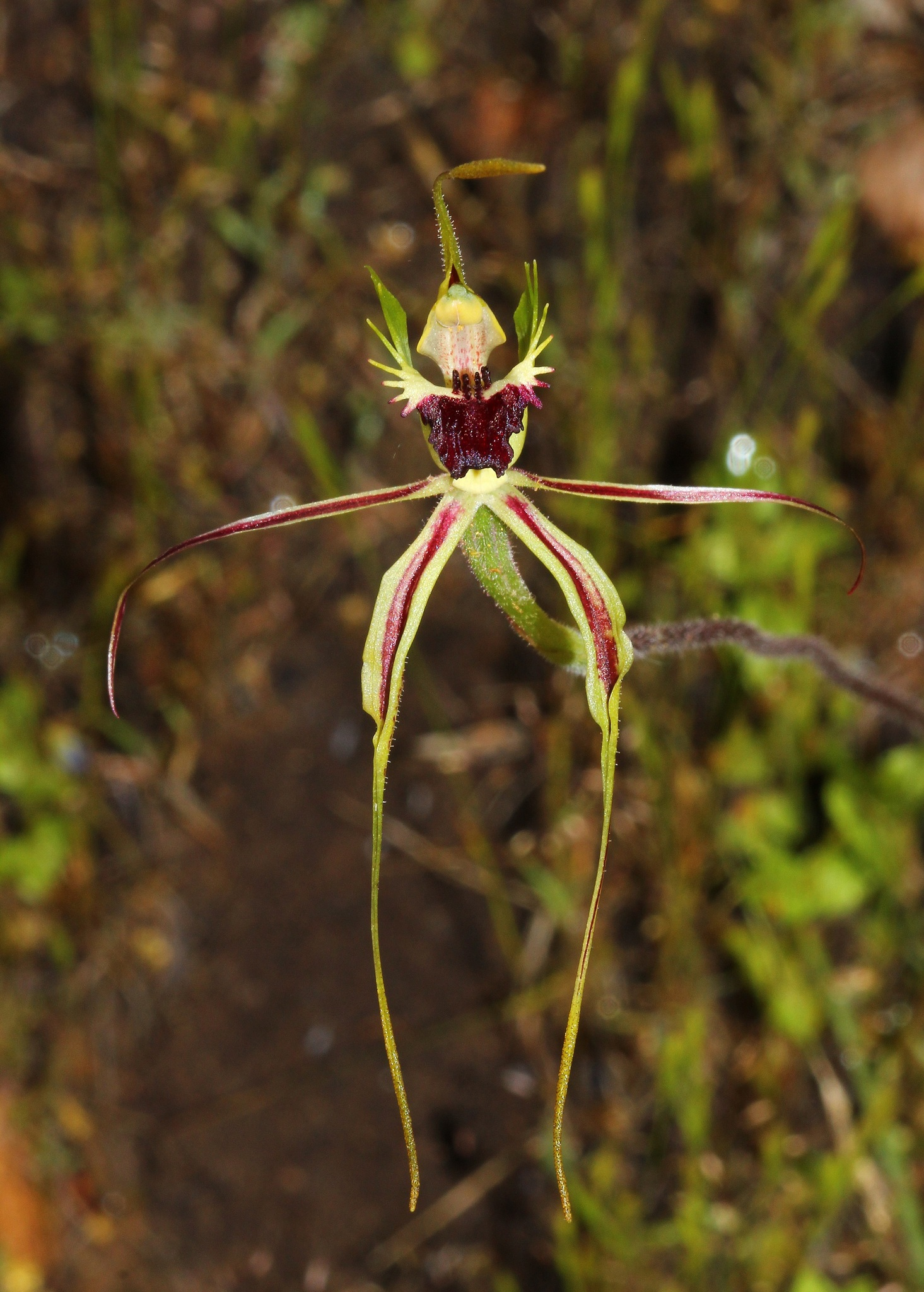
- Flinders Ranges, South Australia

Scientific classification
- Kingdom: Plantae
- Clade: Tracheophytes
- Clade: Angiosperms
- Clade: Monocots
- Order: Asparagales
- Family: Orchidaceae
- Subfamily: Orchidoideae
- Tribe: Diurideae
- Genus: Caladenia
- Species: C. subglabriphylla

Binomial name
- Caladenia subglabriphylla (R.S.Rogers) R.J.Bates

Synonyms
- Caladenia carnea var. pygmaea R.S.Rogers

= Caladenia subglabriphylla =

Species of orchid

Caladenia subglabriphylla is a plant in the orchid family Orchidaceae and is endemic to southern Australia. It was first formally described in 2014 by Robert Bates who gave it the name Arachnorchis subglabriphylla and published the description in Australian Orchid Review. In 2015 Mark Clements changed the name to Caladenia subglabriphylla and published the change in American Journal of Botany. The specific epithet (subglabriphylla) is derived from the Latin prefix sub- meaning "somewhat" or "less than", the word glabrum meaning "hairless", "bald" or "smooth" and the Ancient Greek word phyllon meaning "leaf", hence "almost hairless leaf".
