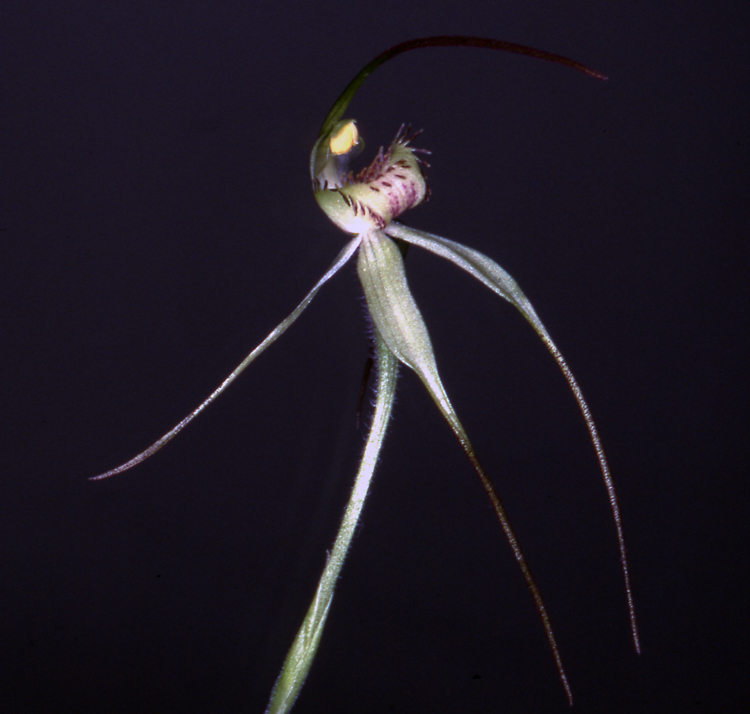
- Near Lake Leake

Scientific classification
- Kingdom: Plantae
- Clade: Embryophytes
- Clade: Tracheophytes
- Clade: Spermatophytes
- Clade: Angiosperms
- Clade: Monocots
- Order: Asparagales
- Family: Orchidaceae
- Subfamily: Orchidoideae
- Tribe: Diurideae
- Genus: Caladenia
- Species: C. helvina

Binomial name
- Caladenia helvina D.L.Jones

Synonyms
- Arachnorchis helvina (D.L.Jones) D.L.Jones & M.A.Clem.

= Caladenia helvina =

Summer spider orchid

Species of orchid

Caladenia helvina, commonly known as the summer spider orchid, is a plant in the orchid family Orchidaceae and is endemic to Tasmania. It is a ground orchid with a single hairy leaf and usually a single greenish-yellow to pale yellow flower with reddish teeth on the sides of the labellum and reddish calli along its mid-line.

== Description ==
Caladenia helvina is a terrestrial, perennial, deciduous, herb with an underground tuber and a single, linear to lance-shaped, dull green, densely hairy leaf 100–160 mm (4–6 in) long and 5–20 mm (0.2–0.8 in) wide. Usually only a single greenish-yellow to pale yellow flower is borne on a thin, wiry, hairy spike 200–500 mm (8–20 in) tall. The sepals and petals are linear in shape near their base but suddenly taper after about one-third of their length to a narrow, thread-like glandular tail. The dorsal sepal is 55–85 mm (2–3 in) long, 3–4 mm (0.1–0.2 in) wide near the base and curves forward. The lateral sepals are a similar size and shape to the dorsal sepal and the petals are slightly shorter and narrower. The labellum is egg-shaped to heart-shaped, about 15–19 mm (0.6–0.7 in) long and 8–10 mm (0.3–0.4 in) wide and is greenish-yellow or dull yellow. The tip of the labellum curls under and there are thin yellow or reddish-purple teeth up to 2 mm (0.08 in) long on the sides of the labellum, and four or six rows of yellowish or purplish, golf club-shaped calli along its mid-line, decreasing in size towards the tip. Flowering occurs from December to January.

== Taxonomy and naming ==
Caladenia helvina was first formally described by David Jones in 1991 and the description was published in Australian Orchid Research. The specific epithet (helvina) is a Latin word meaning "yellowish" or "pale yellow", referring to the colour of the flowers of this orchid.

== Distribution and habitat ==
Summer spider orchid is widespread in Tasmania where it grows in forest in shallow, sometimes stony soil.
