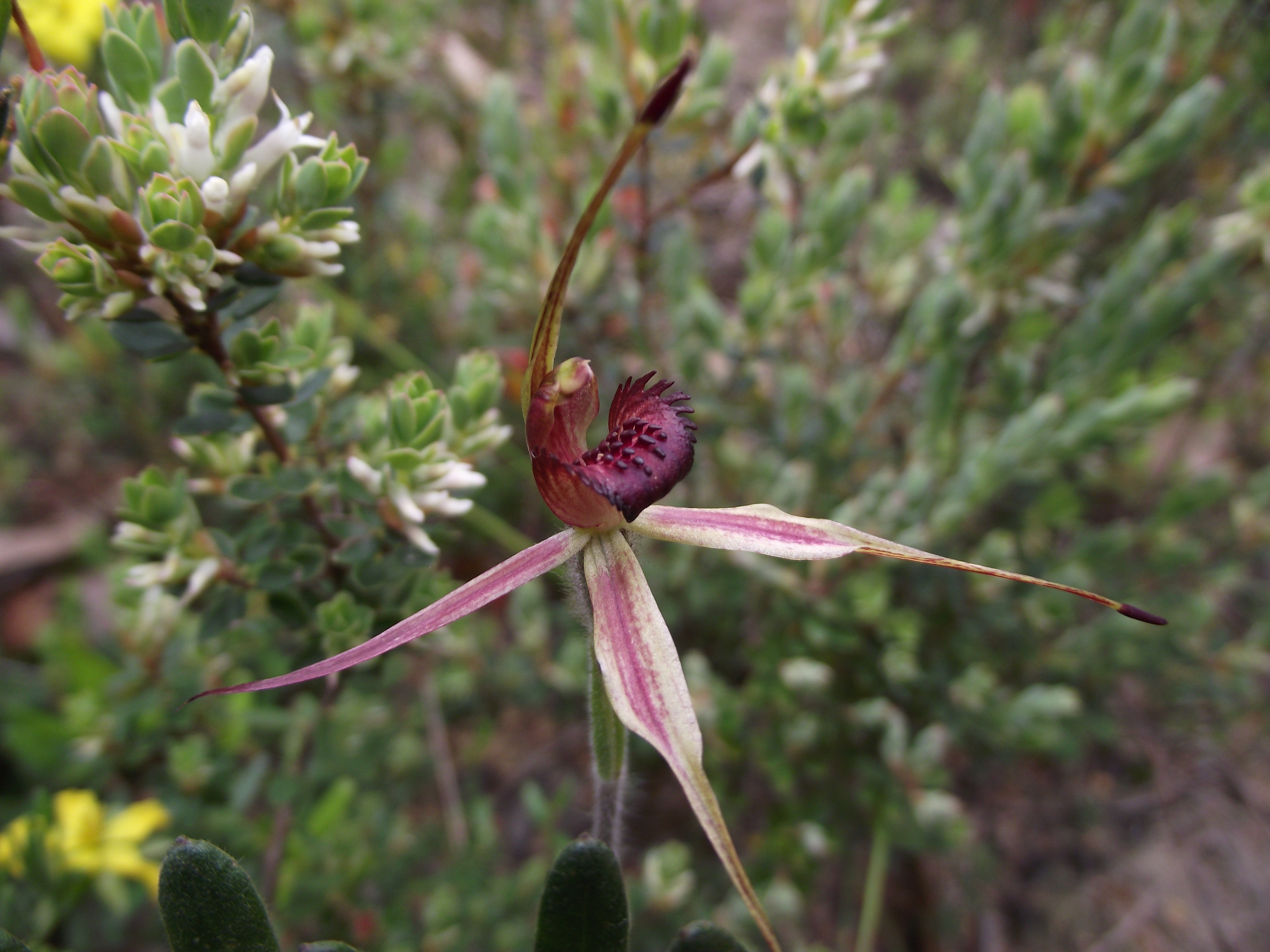

Scientific classification
- Kingdom: Plantae
- Clade: Tracheophytes
- Clade: Angiosperms
- Clade: Monocots
- Order: Asparagales
- Family: Orchidaceae
- Subfamily: Orchidoideae
- Tribe: Diurideae
- Genus: Caladenia
- Species: C. ampla

Binomial name
- Caladenia ampla (D.L.Jones) G.N.Backh.

Synonyms
- Arachnorchis ampla D.L.Jones

= Caladenia ampla =

Dainty spider orchid

Species of orchid

Caladenia ampla, commonly known as the dainty spider orchid, is a plant in the orchid family Orchidaceae and is endemic to Victoria. It is a ground orchid with a single hairy leaf and a single flower which is sometimes yellowish-green flower with red stripes and sometimes entirely red.

== Description ==
Caladenia ampla is a terrestrial, perennial, deciduous, herb with an underground tuber and a single hairy leaf, 6–10 cm (2–4 in) long and 5–7 mm (0.2–0.3 in) wide.

A single flower (rarely two) is borne on a spike up to 22 cm (9 in) high. The dorsal sepal is erect, oblong to lance-shaped, 30–37 mm (1.2–1.5 in) long and about 3 mm (0.1 in) wide. It tapers near the end which terminates in a glandular structure 6.5–9 mm (0.3–0.4 in) long. The lateral sepals are oblong to lance-shaped, 30–37 mm (1.2–1.5 in) long, 4–5 mm (0.16–0.20 in) wide and end in a gland similar to the one on the dorsal sepal. The petals are 28–32 mm (1.1–1.3 in) long, 2–3 mm (0.08–0.1 in) wide and taper to a point. The labellum is a broad egg-shape, curves forward, 14–16 mm (0.55–0.63 in) long and 10–12 mm (0.4–0.5 in) wide when flattened. The labellum is cream-coloured with red veins and a dark red tip, sometimes entirely red. There are 9 to 12 pairs of calli along the edge of the labellum, decreasing in length towards its front. There are four rows of foot-shaped calli in the centre of the labellum, also smaller towards the tip. Flowering occurs in September and October.

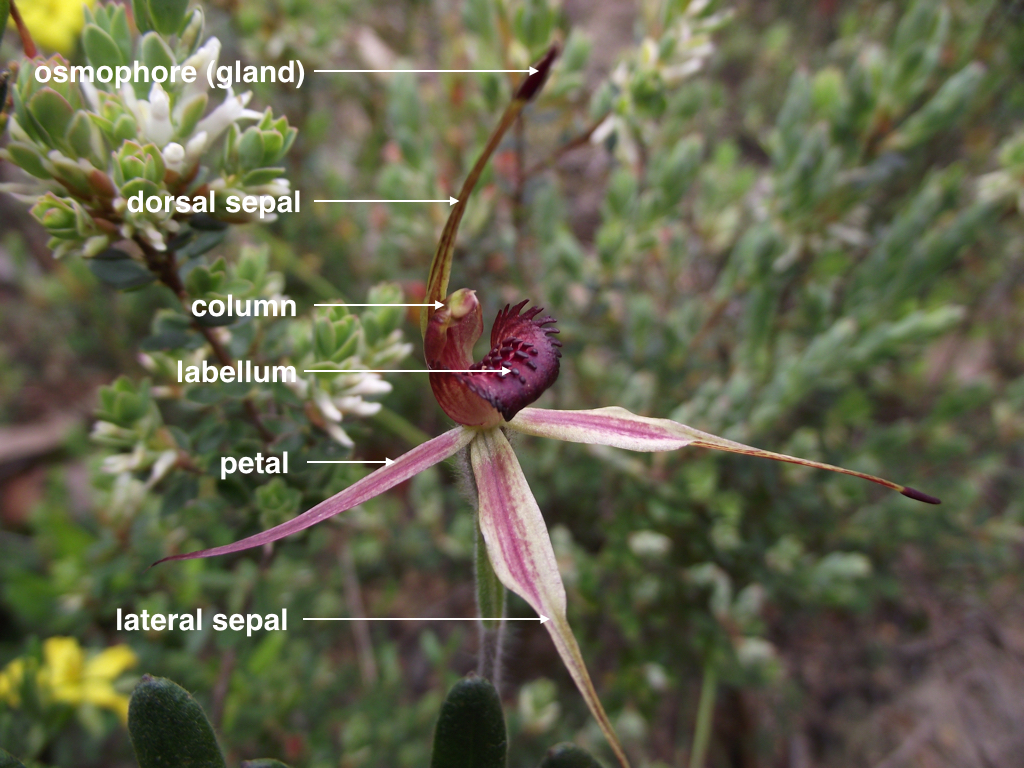
C. ampla labelled

== Taxonomy and naming ==
The species was first formally described by David L. Jones in 2006 and given the name Arachnorchis ampla. The description was published in Australian Orchid Research. In 2007, Gary Backhouse changed the name to Caladenia ampla and the change was published in "The Victorian Naturalist". The specific epithet (ampla) is a Latin word meaning "large", referring to the unusually broad labellum of this orchid.

== Distribution and habitat ==
Caladenia ampla is only known from the goldfields region of Victoria where it grows in mallee scrub and woodlands.

== Conservation ==
This species is classified as "Endangered" by the Victorian government.
