= A. cribricollis =

A. cribricollis may refer to:

- Abacetus cribricollis, a ground beetle
- Acmaeodera cribricollis, a jewel beetle found in Central and North America
- Acyphoderes cribricollis, a longhorn beetle
