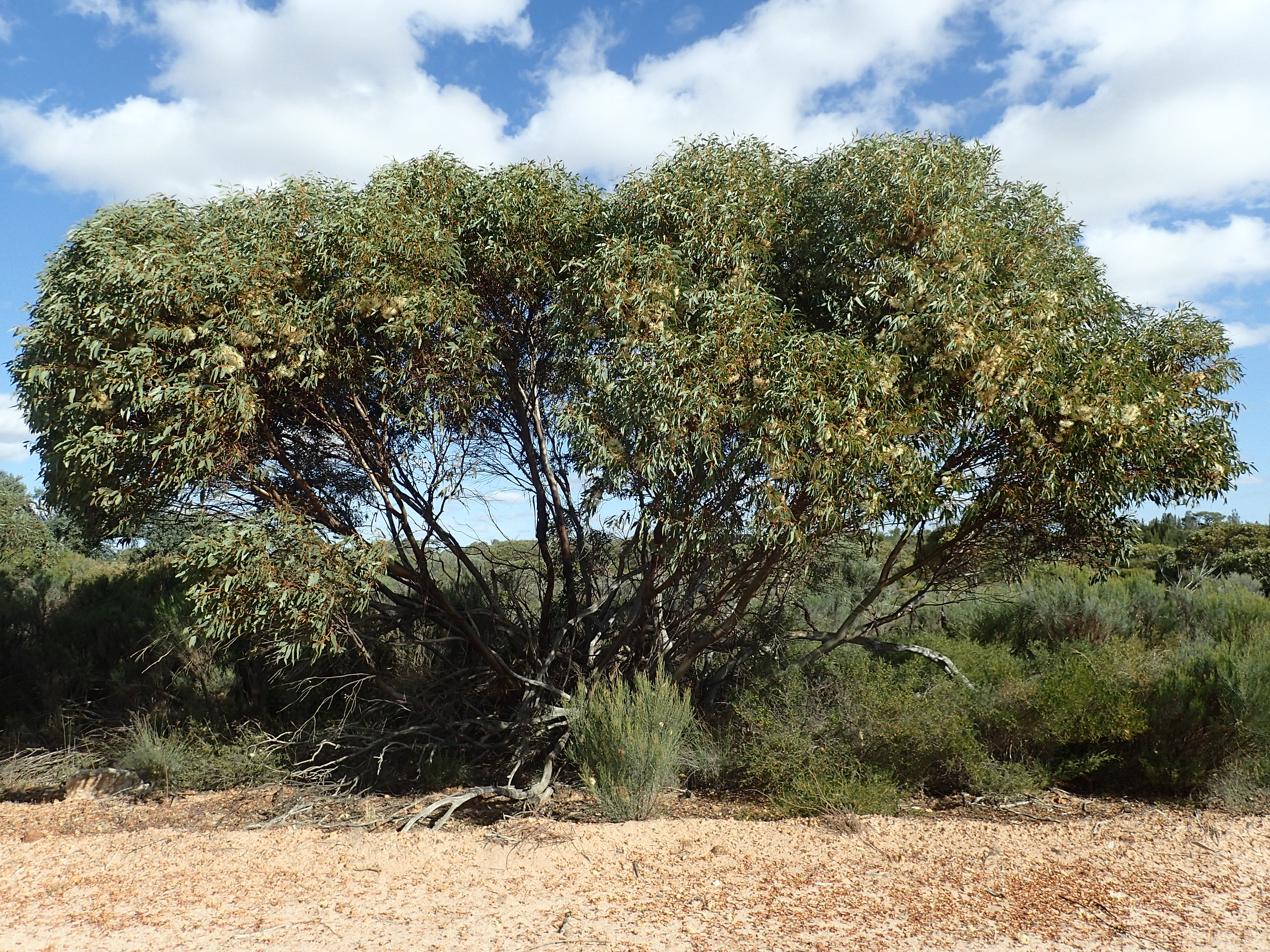
- Eucalyptus diminuta growing near Arrowsmith

Conservation status
- Vulnerable (IUCN 3.1)

Scientific classification
- Kingdom: Plantae
- Clade: Tracheophytes
- Clade: Angiosperms
- Clade: Eudicots
- Clade: Rosids
- Order: Myrtales
- Family: Myrtaceae
- Genus: Eucalyptus
- Species: E. diminuta

Binomial name
- Eucalyptus diminuta Brooker & Hopper

Synonyms
- Eucalyptus sargentii subsp. fallens L.A.S.Johnson & K.D.Hill

= Eucalyptus diminuta =

Spring mallee

Species of eucalyptus

Eucalyptus diminuta, commonly known as the spring mallee, is a species of mallee that is endemic to south-west of Western Australia. It has smooth, silvery to greyish bark, sometimes with rough flaky bark near the base, lance-shaped adult leaves, pendulous, elongated flower buds arranged in groups of seven, creamy white flowers and cup-shaped to bell-shaped fruit.

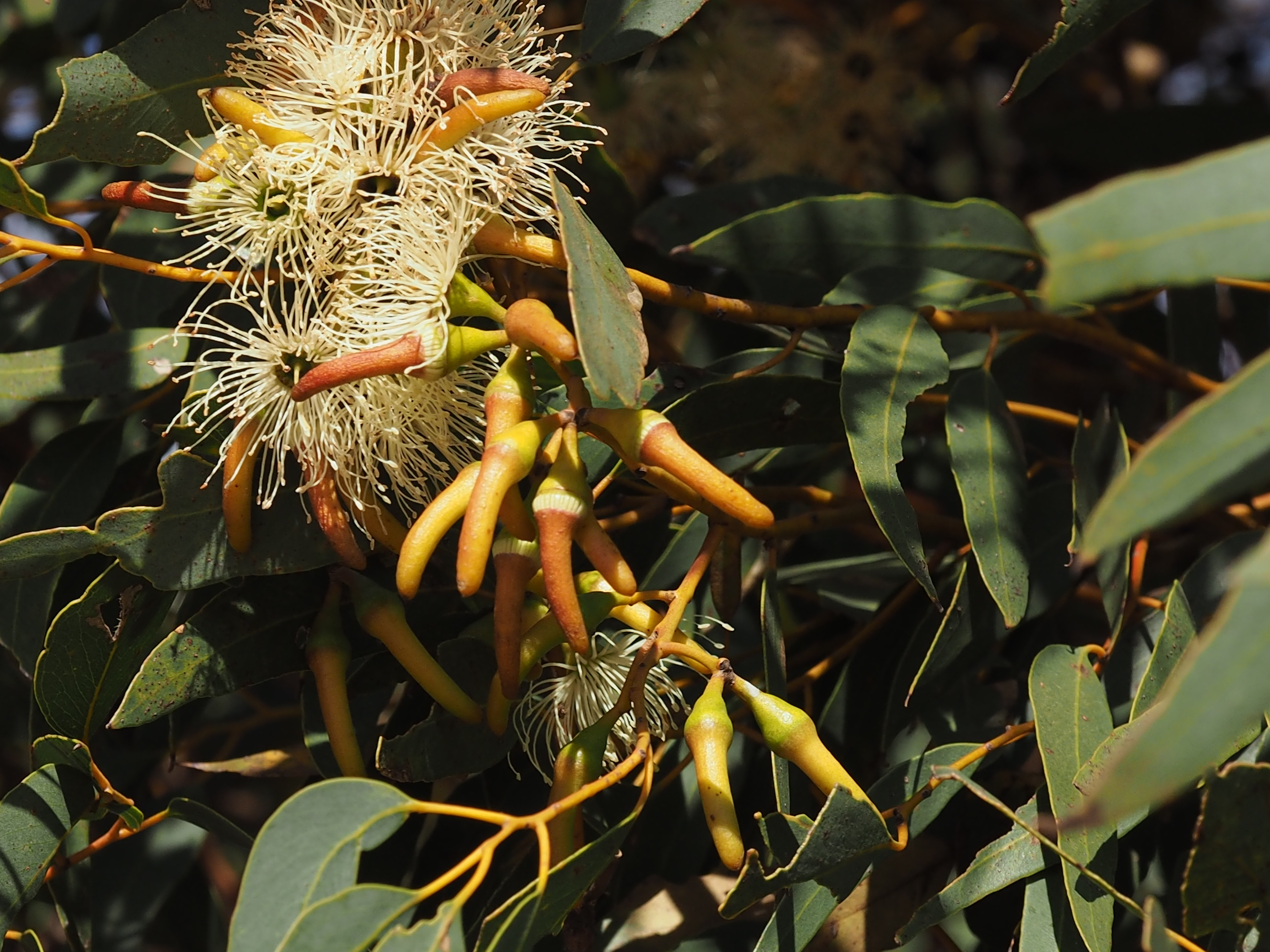
Flowers and buds

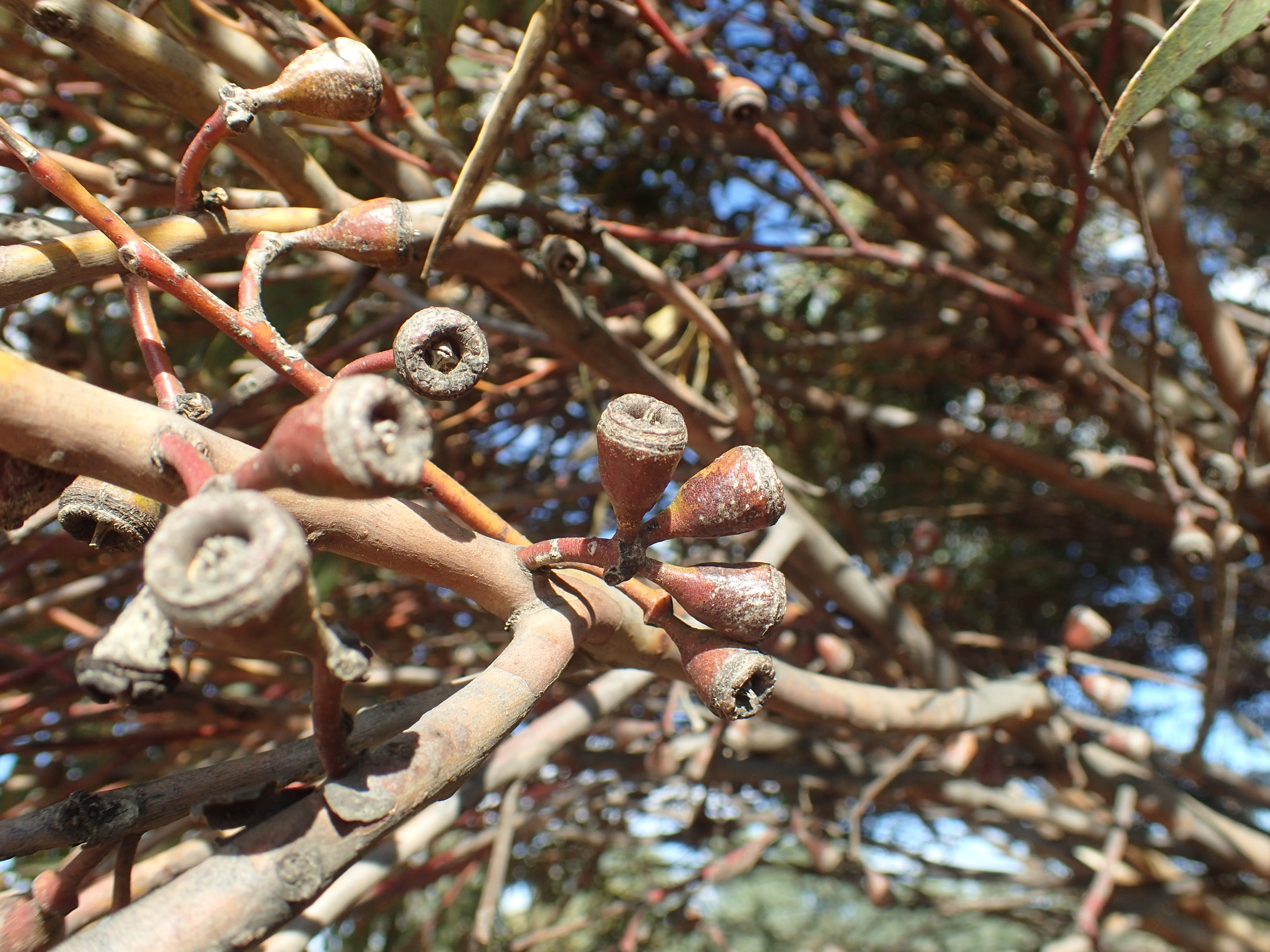
Fruit

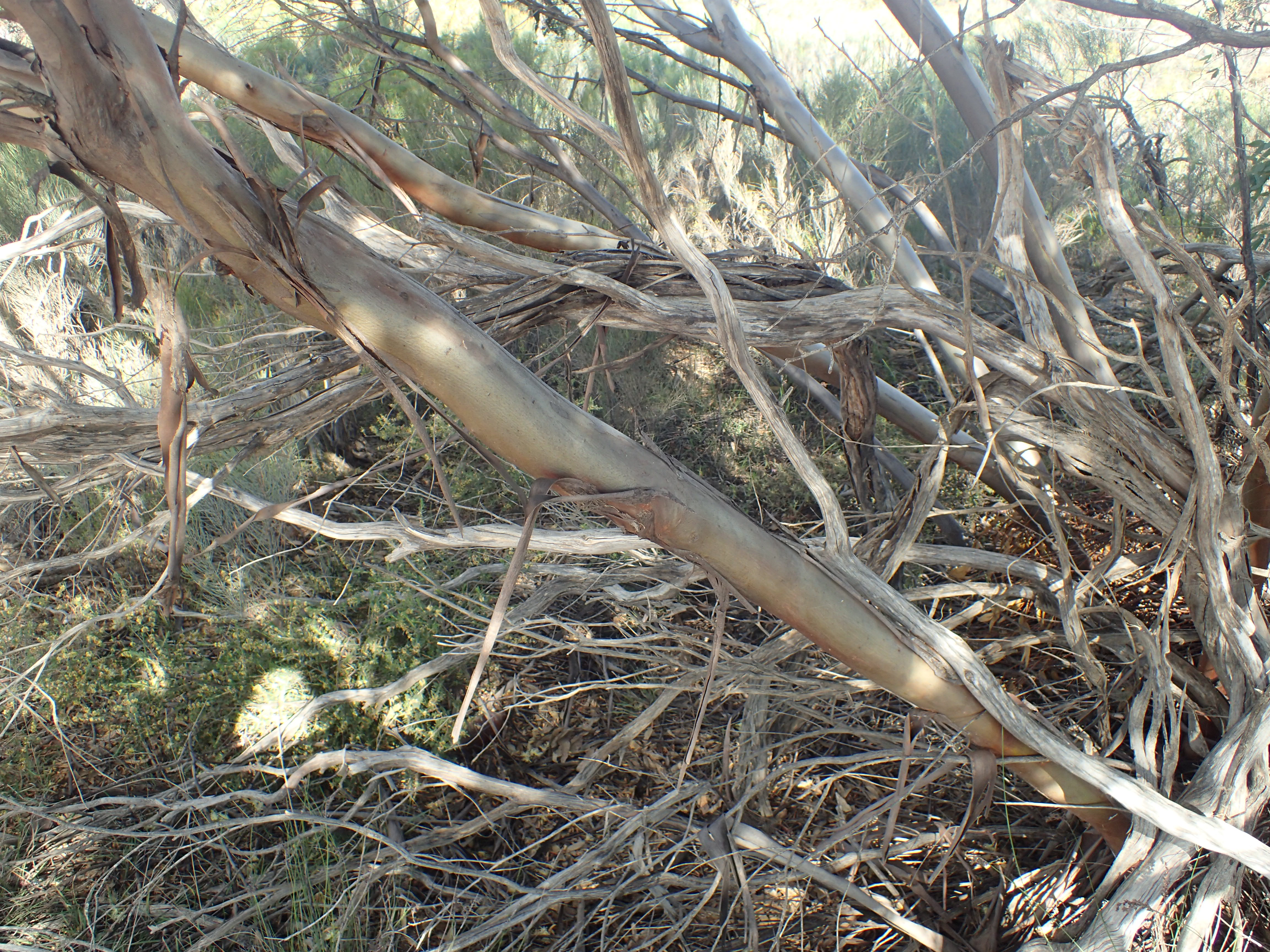
Bark

== Description ==
Eucalyptus diminuta is a mallee that typically grows to a height of 1.7–5 m (5 ft 7 in – 16 ft 5 in) and forms a lignotuber. It has smooth silvery to greyish bark, sometimes with a short stocking of rough flaky bark near the base. Young plants and coppice regrowth have dull, bluish, egg-shaped to lance-shaped leaves 60–90 mm (2.4–3.5 in) long and 15–30 mm (0.59–1.18 in) wide. Adult leaves are lance-shaped, 50–115 mm (2.0–4.5 in) long and 6–20 mm (0.24–0.79 in) wide on a petiole 5–26 mm (0.20–1.02 in) long. The buds are arrange in groups of seven on a thin, pendulous, unbranched peduncle 10–25 mm (0.39–0.98 in) long, the individual buds on a pedicel 1–8 mm (0.039–0.315 in) long. Mature buds are elongated with a rounded tip, 18–27 mm (0.71–1.06 in) long and 4–8 mm (0.16–0.31 in) wide with a conical to horn-shaped operculum. Flowering occurs between July and November and the flowers are creamy white. The fruit is a woody, conical to cup-shaped or bell-shaped capsule 7–12 mm (0.28–0.47 in) long wide with the valves near rim level.

== Taxonomy and naming ==
Eucalyptus diminuta was first formally described by the botanists Ian Brooker and Stephen Hopper in 2002 in the journal Nuytsia. The type specimen was collected by Brooker near Glenfield on the road to Yuna. The specific epithet (diminuta) is a Latin word meaning "diminished", referring to the size of the plants, its buds and fruit compared to the related E. stowardii.

This species is part of the Eucalyptus subgenus Symphyomyrtus in the section Bisectae and the subsection Glandulosae. It is closely related to E. stowardii.

== Distribution and habitat ==
The spring mallee is found on sandplains and near swamps along the west coast in the Mid West and Wheatbelt regions of Western Australia where it grows over laterite in sandy clay or sandy soils.

== Conservation status ==
Eucalyptus diminuta is classified as "not threatened" by the Western Australian Government Department of Parks and Wildlife.

== See also ==
- List of Eucalyptus species
