= A. fulgida =

A. fulgida may refer to:

- Acyphoderes fulgida, a longhorn beetle
- Aeschynomene fulgida, a legume with an aeschynomenoid root nodule
- Anachis fulgida, a dove snail
- Andrena fulgida, a mining bee
- Argia fulgida, a New World damselfly
- Arhopala fulgida, a blue butterfly
