= Caladenia denticulata subsp. albicans =

Alabaster spider orchid

Conservation status
- Priority One — Poorly Known Taxa (DEC)

Scientific classification
- Kingdom: Plantae
- Clade: Tracheophytes
- Clade: Angiosperms
- Clade: Monocots
- Order: Asparagales
- Family: Orchidaceae
- Subfamily: Orchidoideae
- Tribe: Diurideae
- Genus: Caladenia
- Species: C. denticulata
- Subspecies: C. d. subsp. albicans

Trinomial name
- Caladenia denticulata subsp. albicans A.P.Br. & G.Brockman

Synonyms
- Caladenia denticulata (Lindl.) subsp. "Arrowsmith"

Subspecies of orchid

Caladenia denticulata subsp. albicans, commonly known as the alabaster spider orchid, is a plant in the orchid family Orchidaceae and is endemic to the south-west of Western Australia. It has a single erect, hairy leaf and one or two pale creamy-white flowers which have a white labellum with red markings. The only known population occurs in a small area near Arrowsmith.

== Description ==
Caladenia denticulata subsp. albicans is a terrestrial, perennial, deciduous, herb with an underground tuber and a single erect, hairy leaf 6–18 cm (2–7 in) long and 2–4 mm (0.08–0.2 in) wide. One or two flowers are borne on a stem 15–35 cm (6–10 in) high and each flower is 7–10 cm (3–4 in) long and 5–9 cm (2–4 in) wide. The dorsal sepal is erect, 4–7 cm (2–3 in) long and 1.5–3 mm (0.06–0.1 in) wide at the base, linear to lance-shaped, dull white or cream-coloured and has a drooping, dark brown, thread-like glandular tip. The arching lateral sepals and petals are similar in size, shape and colour to the dorsal sepal although the petals are slightly narrower and shorter. The labellum is white with red markings, and curves forward with white to pale red teeth along its margins, the teeth decreasing in size towards the tip. There are up to 13 pairs of anvil-shaped, cream-coloured calli in two rows along about half the length of the labellum and decreasing in size towards the tip. Flowering occurs from August to early September. The dull white colour of the petals and sepals distinguish this from the other subspecies of Caladenia denticulata, but the petals and sepals are also more drooping.

== Taxonomy and naming ==
Caladenia denticulata was first formally described by John Lindley in 1840 and the description was published in A Sketch of the Vegetation of the Swan River Colony. In 2015, Andrew Brown and Garry Brockman described three subspecies, including subspecies albicans and the descriptions were published in Nuytsia. The specific epithet (albicans) is derived from the Latin word albus and means "becoming white", referring to the dull white flowers.

== Distribution and habitat ==
Alabaster spider orchid is only found near Arrowsmith in the Geraldton Sandplains biogeographic region growing in moist calcareous or sandy soil under Eucalyptus camaldulensis and Acacia saligna trees.

== Conservation ==
Caladenia denticulata subsp. albicans is classified as "Priority One" by the Western Australian Government Department of Parks and Wildlife, meaning that it is known from only one or a few locations which are potentially at risk.
