= A. cracentis =

A. cracentis may refer to:

- Acacia cracentis, a flowering plant species
- Acyphoderes cracentis, a beetle species
- Anoplonida cracentis, a squat lobster species
