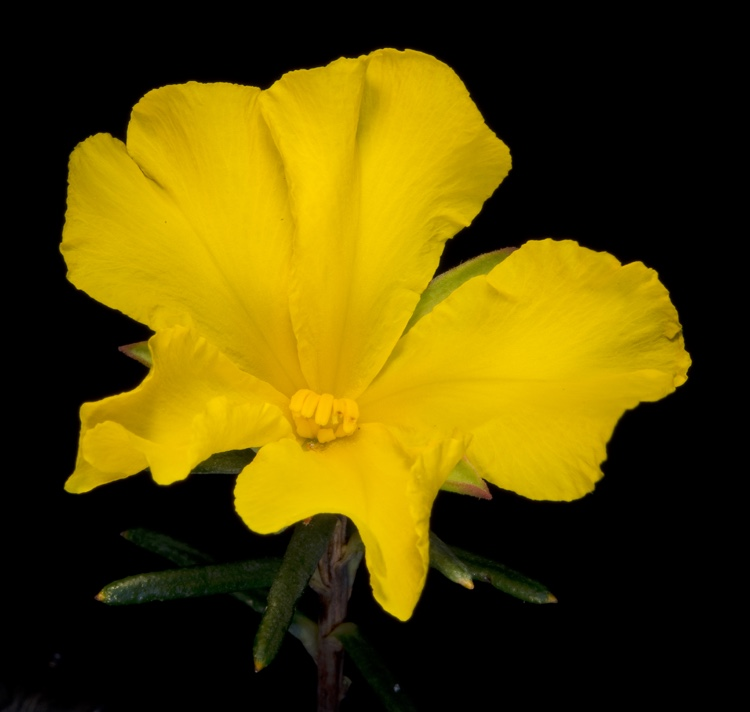
- In the Wotto Nature Reserve, near Eneabba

Scientific classification
- Kingdom: Plantae
- Clade: Tracheophytes
- Clade: Angiosperms
- Clade: Eudicots
- Order: Dilleniales
- Family: Dilleniaceae
- Genus: Hibbertia
- Species: H. robur

Binomial name
- Hibbertia robur K.R.Thiele

= Hibbertia robur =

Species of flowering plant

Hibbertia robur is a species of flowering plant in the family Dilleniaceae and is endemic to the west of Western Australia. It is a strongly erect shrub with linear leaves and a few yellow flowers arranged singly at the ends of branchlets, the flowers with eight to eleven stamens all on one side of the two carpels.

== Description ==
Hibbertia robur is a strongly erect shrub that typically grows up to 30–50 cm (12–20 in) high and 30–120 cm (12–47 in) wide with many stout stems at the base and stout, spreading side-branches. The leaves are erect to spreading, linear, 15–20 mm (0.59–0.79 in) long and 1.6–2.2 mm (0.063–0.087 in) wide, the edges turned downwards. The flowers are arranged singly on the ends of branchlets and are sessile with five to ten, more or less glabrous, triangular bracts 4–8 mm (0.16–0.31 in) long at the base. The five sepals are fused at the base and 8–11 mm (0.31–0.43 in) long with egg-shaped lobes. The five petals are yellow, 12–15 mm (0.47–0.59 in) long and broadly egg-shaped with the narrower end towards the base. There are eight to eleven stamens all on one side of the two carpels, each carpel with two ovules. Flowering has been recorded from May to September.

== Taxonomy ==
Hibbertia robur was first formally described in 2014 by Kevin Thiele in the journal Nuytsia from specimens he collected near Arrowsmith in 2014. The specific epithet (robur) means "strength", referring to the habit, branchlets, leaves and sepals.

== Distribution and habitat ==
This species mainly grows in kwongan and has been recorded from the area between Dongara, Mingenew, Three Springs and Eneabba in the Geraldton Sandplains biogeographic region in the west of Western Australia.

== Conservation status ==
Hibbertia robur is classified as "not threatened" by the Government of Western Australia Department of Biodiversity, Conservation and Attractions.

== See also ==
- List of Hibbertia species
