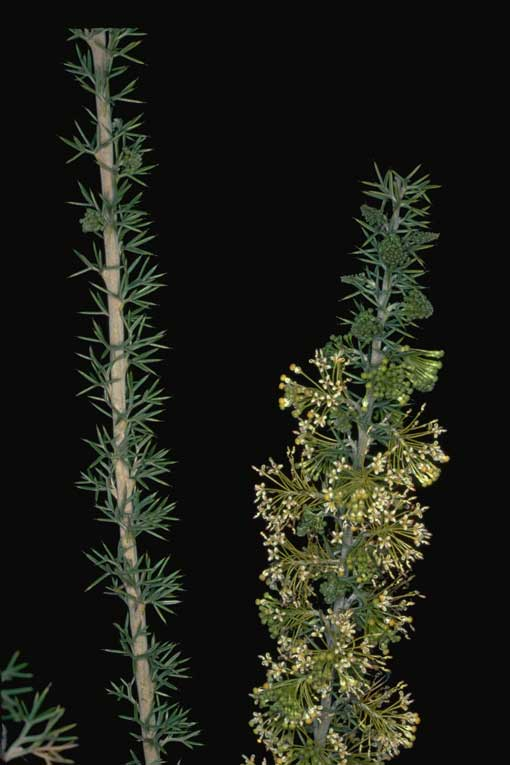
- Near Eneabba

Conservation status
- Vulnerable (IUCN 3.1)

- Priority Three — Poorly Known Taxa (DEC)

Scientific classification
- Kingdom: Plantae
- Clade: Embryophytes
- Clade: Tracheophytes
- Clade: Spermatophytes
- Clade: Angiosperms
- Clade: Eudicots
- Order: Proteales
- Family: Proteaceae
- Genus: Grevillea
- Species: G. erinacea

Binomial name
- Grevillea erinacea Meisn.

= Grevillea erinacea =

Species of shrub endemic to Western Australia

Grevillea erinacea is a species of flowering plant in the family Proteaceae and is endemic to the south-west of Western Australia. It is a spreading shrub with deeply-divided leaves with three to five linear lobes, rotated through 90°, and cream-coloured flowers with a white style.

== Description ==
Grevillea erinacea is a spreading shrub that typically grows to a height of 0.3–1.8 m (1 ft 0 in – 5 ft 11 in), its branchlets covered with woolly to more or less silky hairs. Its leaves are rotated through 90°, 10–35 mm (0.39–1.38 in) long and deeply divided with three to five sharply pointed lobes 5–20 mm (0.20–0.79 in) long and 0.6–1 mm (0.024–0.039 in) wide. The flowers are arranged in more or less spherical to dome-shaped groups along a woolly-hairy rachis. The flowers are greenish in bud, later cream-coloured and silky hairy, the pistil 2.5–4.5 mm (0.098–0.177 in) long with a white style. Flowering occurs from July to December, but mainly from July to October and the fruit is a mostly smooth, oblong to oval follicle 7.5–10 mm (0.30–0.39 in) long.

== Taxonomy ==
Grevillea erinacea was first formally described in 1855 by Carl Meissner in Hooker's Journal of Botany and Kew Garden Miscellany based on material collected by James Drummond. The specific epithet (erinacea) means "hedgehog", referring to the prickly leaves.

== Distribution and habitat ==
This grevillea grows in heath and shrubland in the area between Ellendale, Three Springs and Arrowsmith in the Avon Wheatbelt and Geraldton Sandplains biogeographic regions of south-western Western Australia.

== Conservation status ==
Grevillea erinacea is listed as vulnerable on the IUCN Red List of Threatened Species. This is due to its limited distribution, with an estimated extent of occurrence of 8.410 km^{2} (3.247 sq mi), its severely fragmented range due to habitat clearing from road development and agriculture, and the continuing decline of habitat quality. The species is currently threatened by competition with weeds and clearance of roadside verges where it occurs. Die-back disease (caused by Phytophtora pathogens) is present within the southern half of this species' range, though it is unknown if it is susceptible.

It is also listed as priority three by the Government of Western Australia Department of Biodiversity, Conservation and Attractions, meaning that it is poorly known and known from only a few locations but is not under imminent threat.

== See also ==
- List of Grevillea species
