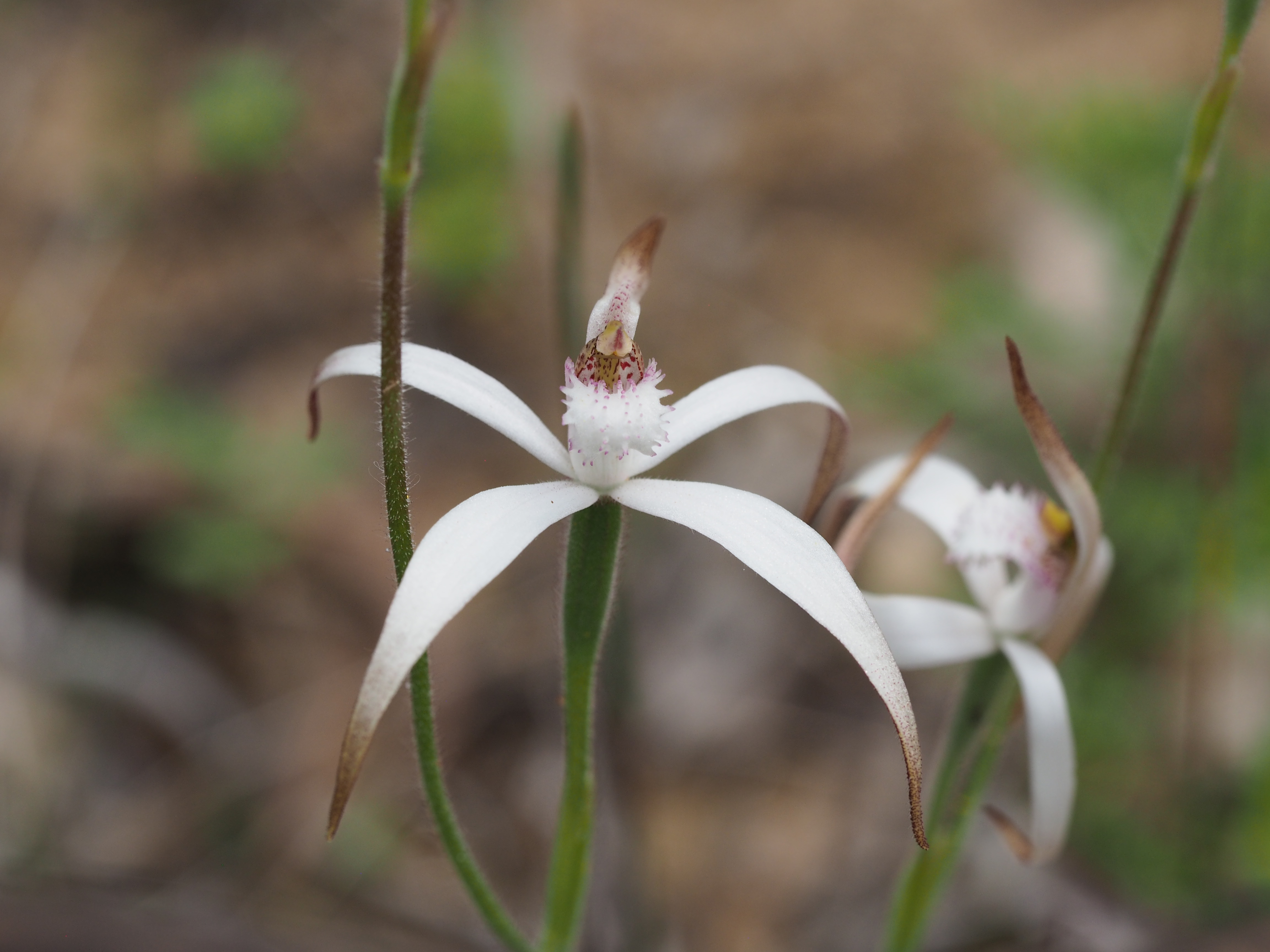

Scientific classification
- Kingdom: Plantae
- Clade: Tracheophytes
- Clade: Angiosperms
- Clade: Monocots
- Order: Asparagales
- Family: Orchidaceae
- Subfamily: Orchidoideae
- Tribe: Diurideae
- Genus: Caladenia
- Species: C. hirta

Binomial name
- Caladenia hirta Lindl.

Synonyms
- Arachnorchis hirta (Lindl.) D.L.Jones & M.A.Clem.; Caladenia tenuis Fitzg.; Calonema hirta Szlach. orth. var.; Calonema hirtum (Lindl.) Szlach.; Calonemorchis hirta (Lindl.) Szlach.

= Caladenia hirta =

Species of orchid

Caladenia hirta, commonly known as sugar candy orchid, flowering plant in the orchid family Orchidaceae and endemic to the south-west of Western Australia. It is a ground orchid with a single broad, hairy leaf and up to six white or pink and white flowers with pink markings.

== Description ==
Caladenia hirta is a terrestrial, perennial, deciduous, sympodial herb with a single, erect or ground-hugging, broadly linear leaf 40–200 mm (1.6–7.9 in) long and 5–20 mm (0.20–0.79 in) wide. The plant is 10–60 mm (0.39–2.36 in) high with up to six white or pink and white flowers 40–200 mm (1.6–7.9 in) long and 30–50 mm (1.2–2.0 in) wide. The dorsal sepal is erect and curves forward, 15–35 mm (0.59–1.38 in) long and 2.5–3.5 mm (0.098–0.138 in) wide, the lateral sepals 15–37 mm (0.59–1.46 in) long and 3–7 mm (0.12–0.28 in) wide, and the petals 10–35 mm (0.39–1.38 in) long and 2–4 mm (0.079–0.157 in) wide. The labellum is white, 10–20 mm (0.39–0.79 in) long and 5–8 mm (0.20–0.31 in) wide with 4 rows of pink calli along its centre. Flowering time depends on subspecies.

== Taxonomy and naming ==
Caladenia hirta was first formally in 1840 by John Lindley in A Sketch of the Vegetation of the Swan River Colony.

In 2001, Stephen Hopper and Andrew Phillip Brown described two subspecies of Caladenia hirta in the journal Nuytsia and the names are accepted by the Australian Plant Census:

- Caladenia hirta R.Br. subsp. hirta - candy orchid, has pale creamy-pink flowers from September to November, with a leaf 60–200 mm (2.4–7.9 in) long, the lateral sepals and petals 20–40 mm (0.79–1.57 in) long.
- Caladenia hirta subsp. rosea Hopper & A.P.Br. - pink candy orchid, has rose-pink flowers from June to September, with a leaf 40–100 mm (1.6–3.9 in) long, the lateral sepals and petals 10–20 mm (0.39–0.79 in) long.

== Distribution and habitat ==
Candy orchid is a common subspecies of C. hirta and grows in Banksia, tuart and peppermint woodland between Arrowsmith and Albany in the Avon Wheatbelt, Esperance Plains, Geraldton Sandplains, Jarrah Forest, Swan Coastal Plain and Warren bioregions of south-west Western Australia. Pink candy orchid is also common and widespread, often growing on granite outcrops, on the edges of salt lakes, and other moist areas, between Kalbarri and Israelite Bay in the Avon Wheatbelt, Coolgardie, Esperance Plains, Geraldton Sandplains, Jarrah Forest, Mallee, Murchison, Swan Coastal Plain, Warren and Yalgoo bioregions.
