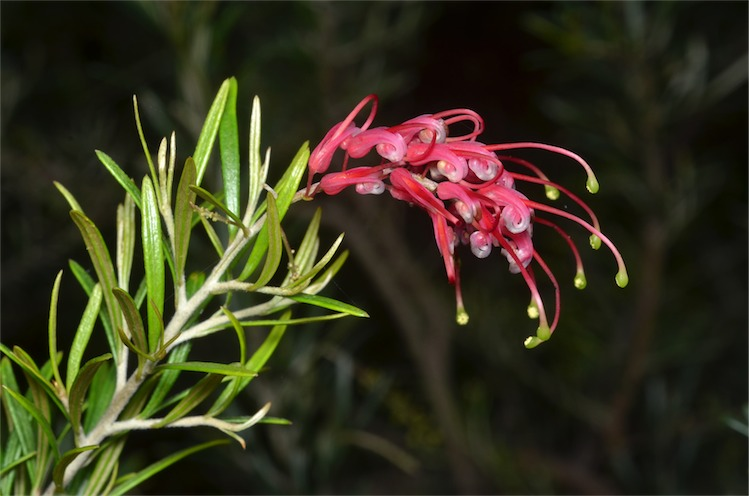
- In the Hunter Region Botanic Gardens

Conservation status
- Data Deficient (IUCN 3.1)

Scientific classification
- Kingdom: Plantae
- Clade: Tracheophytes
- Clade: Angiosperms
- Clade: Eudicots
- Order: Proteales
- Family: Proteaceae
- Genus: Grevillea
- Species: G. exposita

Binomial name
- Grevillea exposita Olde & Marriott

= Grevillea exposita =

Species of shrub endemic to Western Australia

Grevillea exposita is a species of flowering plant in the family Proteaceae and is endemic to the south-west of Western Australia. It is a dense, spreading shrub with mostly oblong to narrowly elliptic leaves and clusters of bright red and white flowers.

== Description ==
Grevillea exposita is an erect to spreading shrub, typically 1–2 m (3 ft 3 in – 6 ft 7 in) high and up to 3 m (9.8 ft) wide, its branchlets densely covered with soft, woolly hairs. The leaves are mostly oblong to narrowly elliptic, 15–30 mm (0.59–1.18 in) long and 1.2–4 mm (0.047–0.157 in) wide. The upper surface of the leaves is more or less glabrous with the edges rolled under, often obscuring most of the lower surface. The flowers are arranged in downcurved clusters of eight to twenty flowers on a rachis 7–17 mm (0.28–0.67 in) long. The flowers are bright red and white with a red, green tipped style, the pistil 20–24 mm (0.79–0.94 in) long. Flowering occurs in winter and spring and the fruit is an oblong follicle 12–13 mm (0.47–0.51 in) long.

== Taxonomy ==
Grevillea exposita was first formally described in 1994 by Peter M. Olde and Neil R. Marriott in The Grevillea Book from specimens collected by Olde near Eneabba in 1992. The specific epithet (exposita) means "exposed", referring to the lower leaf surface.

== Distribution and habitat ==
This grevillea grows near creeks in the area between Eneabba, Arrino and Arrowsmith in the Geraldton Sandplains biogeographic region of south-western Western Australia.

== Conservation status ==
Grevillea exposita is listed as data deficient on the IUCN Red List of Threatened Species, as there is insufficient information on the species' threats and population trend to be able to determine a category on the Red List.

It is also listed not threatened by the Government of Western Australia Department of Biodiversity, Conservation and Attractions.
