= Senna stowardii =

Scientific classification
- Kingdom: Plantae
- Clade: Tracheophytes
- Clade: Angiosperms
- Clade: Eudicots
- Clade: Rosids
- Order: Fabales
- Family: Fabaceae
- Subfamily: Caesalpinioideae
- Genus: Senna
- Species: S. stowardii

Binomial name
- Senna stowardii (S.Moore) Randell

Synonyms
- Cassia stowardii S.Moore; Senna cardiosperma subsp. stowardii (S.Moore) Randell

Species of legume

Senna stowardii is a species of flowering plant in the family Fabaceae and is endemic to inland, southern Western Australia. It is an erect, dense shrub with pinnate leaves, usually with nine to fourteen pairs of linear to narrowly elliptic leaflets, and yellow flowers arranged in groups of three to five, with ten fertile stamens in each flower.

== Description ==
Senna stowardii is an erect, dense shrub that typically grows to a height of 0.6–2 m (2 ft 0 in – 6 ft 7 in). Its leaves are 20–30 mm (0.79–1.18 in) long on a petiole 1–4 mm (0.039–0.157 in) long. The leaves are pinnate, usually with nine to fourteen pairs of linear to narrowly elliptic leaflets 6–10 mm (0.24–0.39 in) long and 1–4 mm (0.039–0.157 in) wide spaced 1–3 mm (0.039–0.118 in) apart. The flowers are yellow and arranged in groups of three to five in upper leaf axils on a peduncle 3–5 mm (0.12–0.20 in) long, each flower on a pedicel 5–10 mm (0.20–0.39 in) long. The petals are 4–6 mm (0.16–0.24 in) long and there are ten fertile stamens in each flower, the anthers 2–3 mm (0.079–0.118 in) long and of different lengths. Flowering occurs in winter and spring, and the fruit is a flat, straight pod 30–50 mm (1.2–2.0 in) long and 6–8 mm (0.24–0.31 in) wide.

== Taxonomy ==
This species was first formally described in 1920 by Spencer Le Marchant Moore who gave it the name Cassia stowardii in the Journal of the Linnean Society, Botany, from specimens collected at Mount Marshall by Frederick Stoward. In 1998, Barbara Rae Randell transferred the species to Senna as S. stowardii in the Flora of Australia. The specific epithet (stowardii) honours the collector of the type specimens.

== Distribution and habitat ==
Senna stowardii grows in arid places on the slopes of breakaways, near salt lakes and on sand dunes in the Avon Wheatbelt, Coolgardie, Gascoyne, Murchison and Yalgoo bioregions of southern inland Western Australia.

== Conservation status ==
Senna stowardii is listed as "not threatened" by the Government of Western Australia Department of Biodiversity, Conservation and Attractions.
