= Caladenia denticulata subsp. rubella =

Clumped spider orchid

Conservation status
- Priority One — Poorly Known Taxa (DEC)

Scientific classification
- Kingdom: Plantae
- Clade: Tracheophytes
- Clade: Angiosperms
- Clade: Monocots
- Order: Asparagales
- Family: Orchidaceae
- Subfamily: Orchidoideae
- Tribe: Diurideae
- Genus: Caladenia
- Species: C. denticulata
- Subspecies: C. d. subsp. rubella

Trinomial name
- Caladenia denticulata subsp. rubella A.P.Br. & G.Brockman

Synonyms
- Caladenia denticulata (Lindl.) subsp. Jarrah forest: Caladenia denticulata (Lindl.) subsp. "red"

Subspecies of orchid

Caladenia denticulata subsp. rubella, commonly known as the clumped spider orchid, is a plant in the orchid family Orchidaceae and is endemic to the south-west of Western Australia. It has a single erect, hairy leaf and one or two dull or pinkish red flowers with prominent dull red markings and with a white labellum with red markings.

== Description ==
Caladenia denticulata subsp. rubella is a terrestrial, perennial, deciduous, herb with an underground tuber and a single erect, hairy leaf 6–18 cm (2–7 in) long and 2–4 mm (0.08–0.2 in) wide. One or two flowers are borne on a stem 15–35 cm (6–10 in) high and each flower is 7–10 cm (3–4 in) long and 5–9 cm (2–4 in) wide. The dorsal sepal is erect, 4–7 cm (2–3 in) long and 1.5–3 mm (0.06–0.1 in) wide at the base, linear to lance-shaped and has a drooping, dark brown, thread-like glandular tip. It is usually dull- to pinkish red, sometimes cream or yellow with prominent dull red markings. The arching lateral sepals and petals are similar in size, shape and colour to the dorsal sepal although the petals are slightly narrower and shorter. The labellum is white with red markings, and curves forward with white to pale red teeth along its margins, the teeth decreasing in size towards the tip. There are up to 13 pairs of anvil-shaped, cream-coloured calli in two rows along about half the length of the labellum and decreasing in size towards the tip. Flowering occurs from August to late September. The dull red or pinkish red colour of the petals and sepals distinguish this from the other subspecies of Caladenia denticulata.

== Taxonomy and naming ==
Caladenia denticulata was first formally described by John Lindley in 1840 and the description was published in A Sketch of the Vegetation of the Swan River Colony. In 2015, Andrew Brown and Garry Brockman described three subspecies, including subspecies rubella and the descriptions were published in Nuytsia. The specific epithet (rubella) is a diminutive form of the Latin word ruber meaning "red", hence "reddish", referring to the colour of the flowers of this subspecies.

== Distribution and habitat ==
Clumped spider orchid occurs near Waroona, Kojonup and Watheroo in the Avon Wheatbelt, Geraldton Sandplains, Jarrah Forest, Swan Coastal Plain biogeographic regions growing in moist soils.

== Conservation ==
Caladenia denticulata subsp. rubella is classified as "not threatened" by the Western Australian Government Department of Parks and Wildlife.
