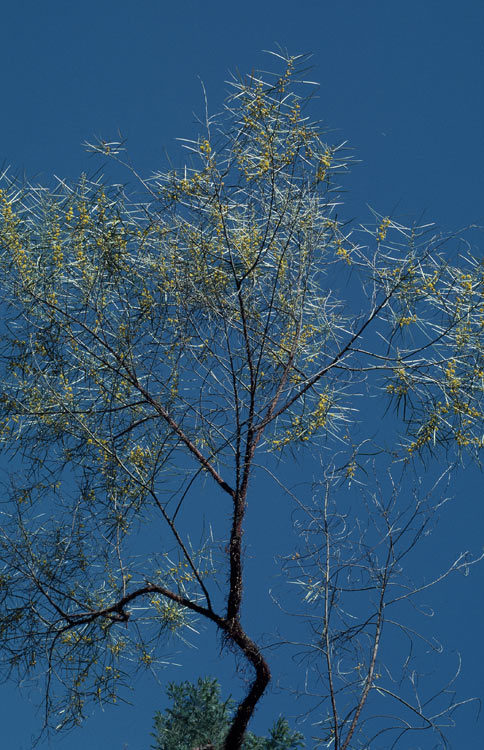
- In the Australian National Botanic Gardens

Scientific classification
- Kingdom: Plantae
- Clade: Embryophytes
- Clade: Tracheophytes
- Clade: Spermatophytes
- Clade: Angiosperms
- Clade: Eudicots
- Clade: Rosids
- Order: Fabales
- Family: Fabaceae
- Subfamily: Caesalpinioideae
- Clade: Mimosoid clade
- Genus: Acacia
- Species: A. fauntleroyi

Binomial name
- Acacia fauntleroyi (Maiden) Maiden & Blakely
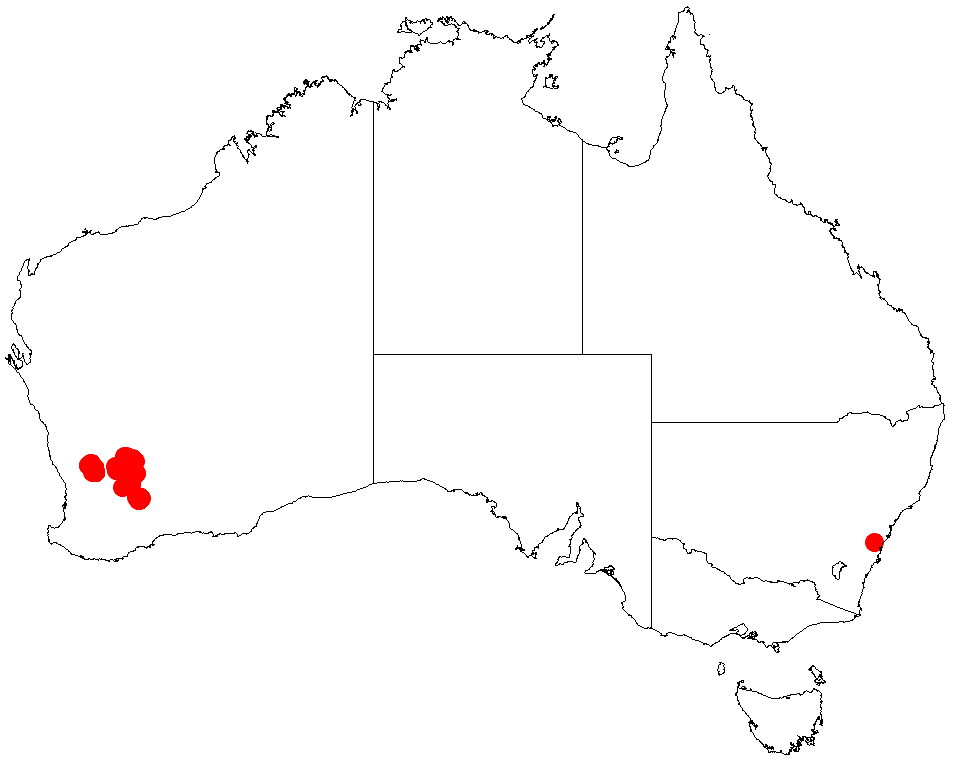
- Occurrence data from AVH

Synonyms
- Acacia oncinophylla var. fauntleroyi Maiden; Racopsperma fauntleroyi Pedley orth. var.; Racosperma fauntleroyi (Maiden) Pedley

= Acacia fauntleroyi =

Species of legume

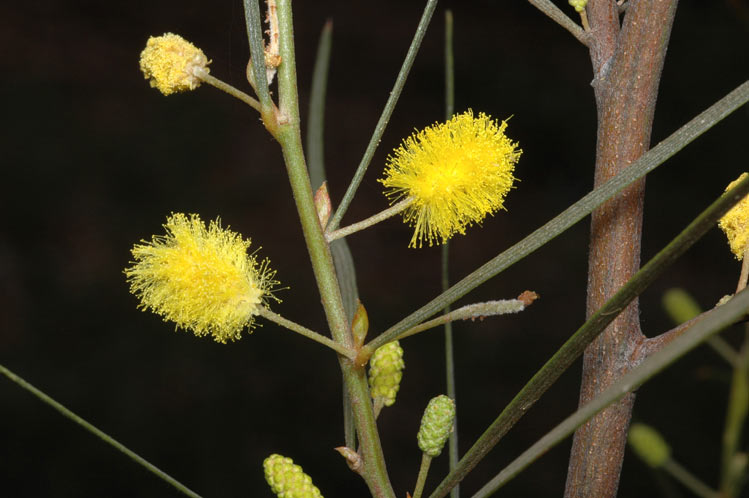
Flowers

Acacia fauntleroyi is a species of flowering plant in the family Fabaceae and is endemic to the inland of Western Australia. It is a shrub or tree with minni-ritchi bark, linear phyllodes, oblong to short-cylindrical heads of yellow flowers and linear, leathery pods slightly raised over the seeds.

== Description ==
Acacia fauntleroyi is shrub or small tree that typically grows to a height of 1.8–7 m (5 ft 11 in – 23 ft 0 in) and has minni-ritchi bark and branchlets covered with silvery hairs pressed against the surface. Its phyllodes are linear, more or less straight to incurved, 80–200 mm (3.1–7.9 in) long, 1.5–4 mm (0.059–0.157 in) wide and silvery to grey-green with mostly seven to nine raised veins on each side and soft, more or less silky hairs pressed against the surface. The flowers are borne in one or two oblong to short-cylindrical heads in axils, on a peduncle 4–9.5 mm (0.16–0.37 in) long. Each head is 7–15 mm (0.28–0.59 in) long and 5.5–7 mm (0.22–0.28 in) wide with 43 to 49 golden yellow flowers. The pods are linear, leathery, straight or slightly curved, up to 100 mm (3.9 in) long, 5 mm (0.20 in) wide, slightly raised over the seeds and covered with more or less silvery hairs pressed against the surface. The seeds are broadly elliptic or oblong, 3.5 to 4 mm (0.14 to 0.16 in) long slightly glossy light to dark brown with an aril on the end.

== Taxonomy ==
This taxon was first formally described in 1920 by Joseph Maiden, who gave it the name Acacia oncinophylla var. fauntleroyi in the Journal and Proceedings of the Royal Society of New South Wales from specimens collected by Frederick Stoward. In 1927, Maiden and William Blakely raised the variety to species status as Acacia fauntleroyi in the Journal of the Royal Society of Western Australia. The specific epithet (fauntleroyi) honours Charles Alfred Fauntleroy of Uberin Hill, Dowerin.

== Distribution and habitat ==
Acacia fauntleroyi grows on or around granite outcrops in scrub and shrubland from near Wongan Hills and Bonnie Rock and south to Hyden in the Avon Wheatbelt, Coolgardie and Mallee bioregions of inland Western Australia.

== Conservation status ==
Acacia fauntleroyi is listed as "not threatened" by the Government of Western Australia Department of Biodiversity, Conservation and Attractions.

== See also ==
- List of Acacia species
