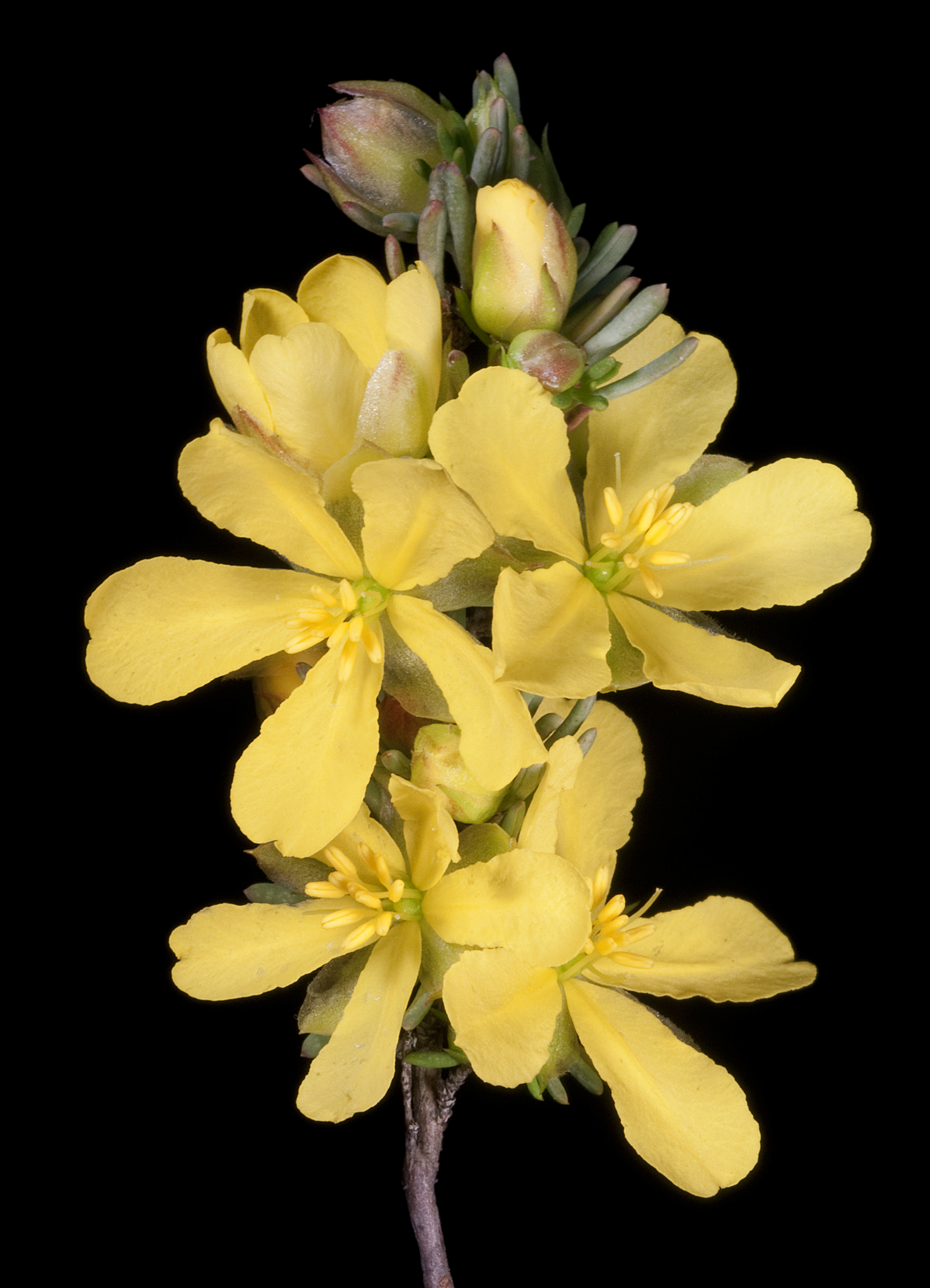

Scientific classification
- Kingdom: Plantae
- Clade: Tracheophytes
- Clade: Angiosperms
- Clade: Eudicots
- Order: Dilleniales
- Family: Dilleniaceae
- Genus: Hibbertia
- Species: H. rupicola

Binomial name
- Hibbertia rupicola (S.Moore) C.A.Gardner

= Hibbertia rupicola =

Species of flowering plant

Hibbertia rupicola is a species of flowering plant in the family Dilleniaceae and is endemic to the south-west of Western Australia. It is a shrub with densely-clustered, linear leaves and yellow flowers with nine to seventeen stamens arranged around three glabrous carpels.

== Description ==
Hibbertia rupicola is a shrub that typically grows to a height of 0.7–1 m (2 ft 4 in – 3 ft 3 in), its branchlets hairy when young. The leaves are clustered on short side shoots, linear, 3–15 mm (0.12–0.59 in) long, 0.4–0.7 mm (0.016–0.028 in) wide and sessile with the edges rolled under. The flowers are arranged on the ends of short side shoots and are 8–14 mm (0.31–0.55 in) wide, with one or two inconspicuous bracts at the base. The five sepals are fused at the base, the two outer sepals 3–4 mm (0.12–0.16 in) long and the inner sepals 3.5–6.5 mm (0.14–0.26 in) long. The five petals are yellow, egg-shaped with the narrower end towards the base and 5–10 mm (0.20–0.39 in) long with a small notch at the tip. There are nine to seventeen stamens in three groups, two free from the others, all arranged around three glabrous carpels that each contain a single ovule. Flowering occurs from March to April or from September to December.

== Taxonomy ==
This species was first formally described in 1920 by Spencer Le Marchant Moore who gave it the name Candollea rupicola in the Journal of the Linnean Society, Botany from specimens collected near Bruce Rock by Frederick Stoward. In 1931, Charles Gardner changed the name to Hibbertia rupicola. The specific epithet (rupicola) means "rock inhabitant".

== Distribution and habitat ==
Hibbertia rupicola grows in woodland, mallee, shrubland or heath and occurs in the Avon Wheatbelt, Coolgardie, Esperance Plains, Geraldton Sandplains, Jarrah Forest, Mallee and Murchison biogeographic regions of south-western Western Australia.

== Conservation status ==
This hibbertia is classified as "not threatened" by the Government of Western Australia Department of Biodiversity, Conservation and Attractions.

== See also ==
- List of Hibbertia species
