= Acyphoderes acutipennis =

Scientific classification
- Domain: Eukaryota
- Kingdom: Animalia
- Phylum: Arthropoda
- Class: Insecta
- Order: Coleoptera
- Suborder: Polyphaga
- Infraorder: Cucujiformia
- Family: Cerambycidae
- Genus: Acyphoderes
- Species: A. acutipennis

Binomial name
- Acyphoderes acutipennis Thomson, 1860

Species of beetle

Acyphoderes acutipennis is a species of beetle in the family Cerambycidae. It was described by Thomson in 1860.
