= Acacia cracentis =

Scientific classification
- Kingdom: Plantae
- Clade: Tracheophytes
- Clade: Angiosperms
- Clade: Eudicots
- Clade: Rosids
- Order: Fabales
- Family: Fabaceae
- Subfamily: Caesalpinioideae
- Clade: Mimosoid clade
- Genus: Acacia
- Species: A. cracentis

Binomial name
- Acacia cracentis R.S.Cowan & Maslin
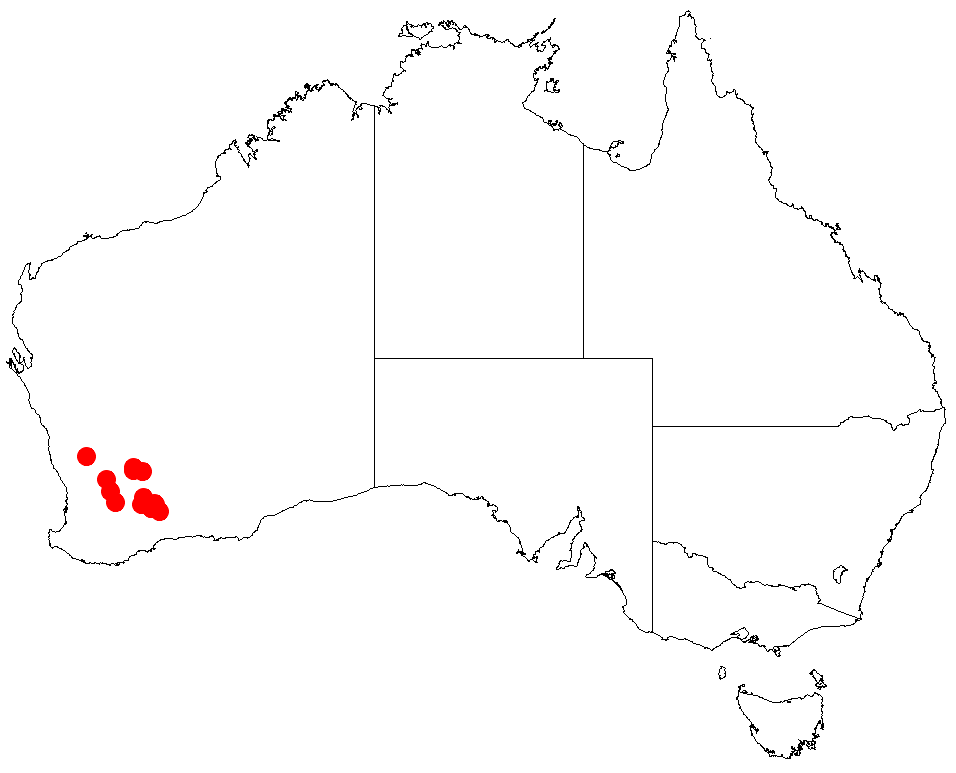
- Occurrence data from AVH

Synonyms
- Racosperma cracente (R.S.Cowan & Maslin) Pedley

Species of legume

Acacia cracentis is a species of flowering plant in the family Fabaceae and is endemic to the south-west of Western Australia. It is a bushy shrub with mostly straight, terete phyllodes, more or less spherical heads of golden yellow flowers and erect, linear, thinly leathery pods.

== Description ==
Acacia cracentis is a bushy, rounded or conical shrub that typically grows to a height of 0.5–2 m (1 ft 8 in – 6 ft 7 in). Its branchlets are covered with silky hairs between ribs at the ends. The phyllodes are terete, straight to very slightly curved, 25–60 mm (0.98–2.36 in) long and 0.5–0.7 mm (0.020–0.028 in) in diameter with eight broad, more or less flat topped veins. The flowers are borne in a sessile, more or less spherical head in axils, 4.5–6 mm (0.18–0.24 in) in diameter with 12 to 20 golden yellow flowers. Flowering occurs from July to September, and the pods are erect, linear, thinly leathery, up to 50 mm (2.0 in) long and 1–2 mm (0.039–0.079 in) wide and slightly raised over and slightly constricted between the seeds. The seeds are elliptic, 2.0–2.5 mm (0.079–0.098 in) wide and glossy with a conical white aril on the end that us nearly as long as the seed.

== Taxonomy ==
Acacia cracentis was first formally described in 1999 by Richard Sumner Cowan and Bruce Maslin in the journal Nuytsia from specimens Maslin collected in the Chiddarcooping Nature Reserve in 1989. The specific epithet (cracentis) means 'slender' or 'graceful', alluding to the very thin phyllodes.

== Distribution ==
This species of wattle is native to a small area between the Chiddarcooping Nature Reserve north east of Merredin and from Gibb Rock to Hyden and Lake Hurlstone in the Avon Wheatbelt, Geraldton Sandplains and Mallee bioregions of south-western Western Australia. It grows near granite outcrops or along watercourses in gravelly loam soils in Melaleuca scrub or low heath and in Eucalyptus stowardii and Allocasuarina campestris shrubland.

== See also ==
- List of Acacia species
