= Acyphoderes synoecae =

Scientific classification
- Domain: Eukaryota
- Kingdom: Animalia
- Phylum: Arthropoda
- Class: Insecta
- Order: Coleoptera
- Suborder: Polyphaga
- Infraorder: Cucujiformia
- Family: Cerambycidae
- Genus: Acyphoderes
- Species: A. synoecae

Binomial name
- Acyphoderes synoecae Chemsak & Noguera, 1997

Species of beetle

Acyphoderes synoecae is a species of beetle in the family Cerambycidae. It was described by Chemsak and Noguera in 1997.
