= Acyphoderes =

Scientific classification
- Domain: Eukaryota
- Kingdom: Animalia
- Phylum: Arthropoda
- Class: Insecta
- Order: Coleoptera
- Suborder: Polyphaga
- Infraorder: Cucujiformia
- Family: Cerambycidae
- Tribe: Rhinotragini
- Genus: Acyphoderes

Genus of beetles

Acyphoderes is a genus of beetles in the family Cerambycidae, containing the following species:

- Acyphoderes abdominalis (Olivier, 1795)
- Acyphoderes acutipennis Thomson, 1860
- Acyphoderes amoena Chemsak & Linsley, 1979
- Acyphoderes auricapilla Fisher, 1947
- Acyphoderes aurulenta (Kirby, 1818)
- Acyphoderes ayalai Chemsak & Linsley, 1988
- Acyphoderes bayanicus Giesbert, 1991
- Acyphoderes carinicollis Bates, 1873
- Acyphoderes cracentis Chemsak & Noguera, 1997
- Acyphoderes cribricollis Bates, 1892
- Acyphoderes crinita (Klug, 1825)
- Acyphoderes dehiscens Chemsak, 1997
- Acyphoderes delicata Horn, 1894
- Acyphoderes fulgida Chemsak & Linsley, 1979
- Acyphoderes hirtipes (Klug, 1825)
- Acyphoderes itaiuba Martins & Galileo, 2004
- Acyphoderes longicollis Chemsak & Noguera, 1993
- Acyphoderes magna Giesbert, 1991
- Acyphoderes odyneroides White, 1855
- Acyphoderes parva Chemsak & Linsley, 1979
- Acyphoderes prolixa Chemsak & Linsley, 1979
- Acyphoderes rubrohirsutotibialis Tippmann, 1953
- Acyphoderes sexualis Linsley, 1934
- Acyphoderes suavis Bates, 1885
- Acyphoderes synoecae Chemsak & Noguera, 1997
- Acyphoderes velutina Bates, 1885
- Acyphoderes yucateca (Bates, 1892)
