= Acyphoderes aurulenta =

Scientific classification
- Domain: Eukaryota
- Kingdom: Animalia
- Phylum: Arthropoda
- Class: Insecta
- Order: Coleoptera
- Suborder: Polyphaga
- Infraorder: Cucujiformia
- Family: Cerambycidae
- Genus: Acyphoderes
- Species: A. aurulenta

Binomial name
- Acyphoderes aurulenta (Kirby, 1818)

Species of beetle

Acyphoderes aurulenta is a species of beetle in the family Cerambycidae. It was described by William Kirby in 1818.
