= Acyphoderes magna =

Scientific classification
- Domain: Eukaryota
- Kingdom: Animalia
- Phylum: Arthropoda
- Class: Insecta
- Order: Coleoptera
- Suborder: Polyphaga
- Infraorder: Cucujiformia
- Family: Cerambycidae
- Genus: Acyphoderes
- Species: A. magna

Binomial name
- Acyphoderes magna Giesbert, 1991

Species of beetle

Acyphoderes magna is a species of beetle in the family Cerambycidae. It was described by Giesbert in 1991.
