= Acyphoderes rubrohirsutotibialis =

Scientific classification
- Kingdom: Animalia
- Phylum: Arthropoda
- Clade: Pancrustacea
- Class: Insecta
- Order: Coleoptera
- Suborder: Polyphaga
- Infraorder: Cucujiformia
- Family: Cerambycidae
- Genus: Acyphoderes
- Species: A. rubrohirsutotibialis

Binomial name
- Acyphoderes rubrohirsutotibialis Tippmann, 1953

Species of beetle

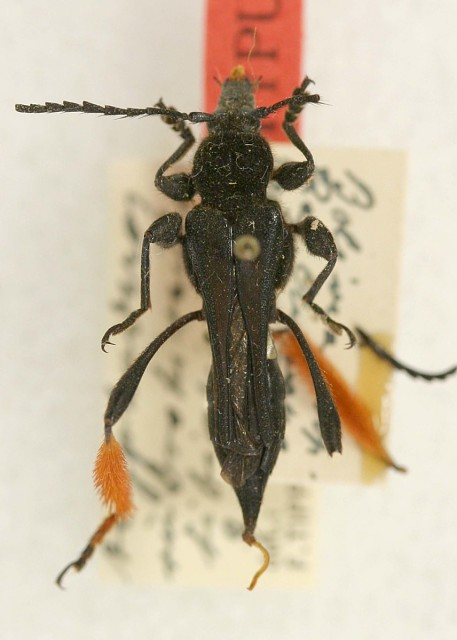
Acyphoderes rubrohirsutotibialis

Acyphoderes rubrohirsutotibialis is a species of beetle in the family Cerambycidae. It was described by Tippmann in 1953.
