= Acyphoderes amoena =

Scientific classification
- Domain: Eukaryota
- Kingdom: Animalia
- Phylum: Arthropoda
- Class: Insecta
- Order: Coleoptera
- Suborder: Polyphaga
- Infraorder: Cucujiformia
- Family: Cerambycidae
- Genus: Acyphoderes
- Species: A. amoena

Binomial name
- Acyphoderes amoena Chemsak & Linsley, 1979

Species of beetle

Acyphoderes amoena is a species of beetle in the family Cerambycidae. It was described by Chemsak and Linsley in 1979.
