= Acyphoderes ayalai =

Scientific classification
- Domain: Eukaryota
- Kingdom: Animalia
- Phylum: Arthropoda
- Class: Insecta
- Order: Coleoptera
- Suborder: Polyphaga
- Infraorder: Cucujiformia
- Family: Cerambycidae
- Genus: Acyphoderes
- Species: A. ayalai

Binomial name
- Acyphoderes ayalai Chemsak & Linsley, 1988

Species of beetle

Acyphoderes ayalai is a species of beetle in the family Cerambycidae. It was described by Chemsak and Linsley in 1988.
