= Acyphoderes crinita =

Scientific classification
- Domain: Eukaryota
- Kingdom: Animalia
- Phylum: Arthropoda
- Class: Insecta
- Order: Coleoptera
- Suborder: Polyphaga
- Infraorder: Cucujiformia
- Family: Cerambycidae
- Genus: Acyphoderes
- Species: A. crinita

Binomial name
- Acyphoderes crinita (Klug, 1825)

Species of beetle

Acyphoderes crinita is a species of beetle in the family Cerambycidae. It was described by Johann Christoph Friedrich Klug in 1825.
