= Acmaeodera cribricollis =

Scientific classification
- Kingdom: Animalia
- Phylum: Arthropoda
- Class: Insecta
- Order: Coleoptera
- Suborder: Polyphaga
- Infraorder: Elateriformia
- Family: Buprestidae
- Genus: Acmaeodera
- Species: A. cribricollis

Binomial name
- Acmaeodera cribricollis Horn, 1894

Synonyms
- Acmaeodera larreae Fall, 1907

Species of beetle

Acmaeodera cribricollis is a species of metallic wood-boring beetle in the family Buprestidae. It is found in Central America and North America. It can be found on Neltuma glandulosa plants.
