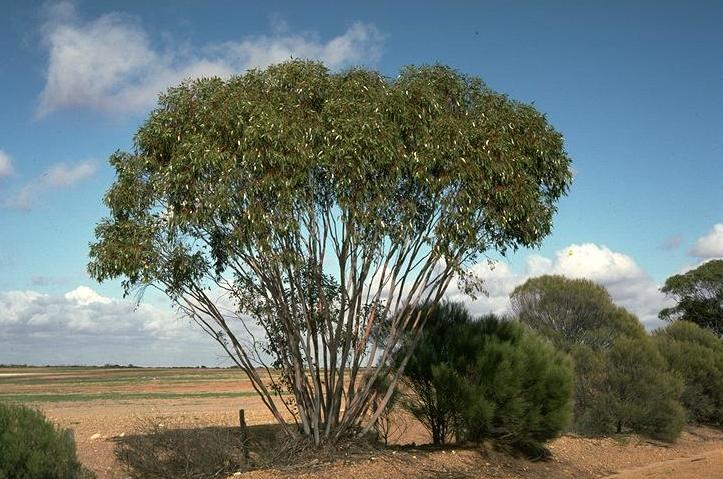
- Eucalyptus stowardii between Bencubbin and Koorda

Scientific classification
- Kingdom: Plantae
- Clade: Tracheophytes
- Clade: Angiosperms
- Clade: Eudicots
- Clade: Rosids
- Order: Myrtales
- Family: Myrtaceae
- Genus: Eucalyptus
- Species: E. stowardii

Binomial name
- Eucalyptus stowardii Maiden

Synonyms
- Eucalyptus stowardiMaiden orth. var.

= Eucalyptus stowardii =

Fluted-horn mallee

Species of eucalyptus

Eucalyptus stowardii, commonly known as fluted-horn mallee, is a species of mallee that is endemic to the south-west of Western Australia. It has smooth bark, lance-shaped adult leaves, flower buds in groups of seven, creamy white flowers and ribbed, cylindrical to cup-shaped fruit.

== Description ==
Eucalyptus stowardii is a mallee that typically grows to a height of 2.5–7 m (8 ft 2 in – 23 ft 0 in) and forms a lignotuber. It has smooth grey bark on the trunk and branches. Young plants and coppice regrowth have dull bluish green, egg-shaped to lance-shaped leaves that are 80–110 mm (3.1–4.3 in) long and 20–80 mm (0.79–3.15 in) wide and petiolate. Adult leaves are the same shade of glossy green on both sides, lance-shaped, 60–138 mm (2.4–5.4 in) long and 12–33 mm (0.47–1.30 in) wide, tapering at the base to a petiole 13–33 mm (0.51–1.30 in) long. The flower buds are arranged in leaf axils, usually in groups of seven on a thin, unbranched peduncle 15–35 mm (0.59–1.38 in) long, the individual buds on pedicels 3–12 mm (0.12–0.47 in) long. Mature buds are a blunt, elongated oval shape, 22–39 mm (0.87–1.54 in) long and 6–10 mm (0.24–0.39 in) wide and finely ribbed with a rounded operculum about the same length as the floral cup. Flowering occurs between June and November and the flowers are creamy white.

== Taxonomy and naming ==
Eucalyptus stowardii was first formally described in 1917 by Joseph Maiden in the Journal and Proceedings of the Royal Society of New South Wales from specimens collected near Kellerberrin by Frederick Stoward. The specific epithet honours the collector of the type specimens.

== Distribution and habitat ==
The fluted-horn mallee is found on stony rises, limestone hills and road verges between Dowerin, Carnamah and Wubin in the central northern Wheatbelt region of Western Australia, where it grows in open shrubland in gravelly sand-loam soils.

== Conservation status ==
This mallee is classified as "not threatened" by the Western Australian Government Department of Parks and Wildlife.

== See also ==
- List of Eucalyptus species
