= Frederick Stoward =

Western Australian botanist (1866–1931)

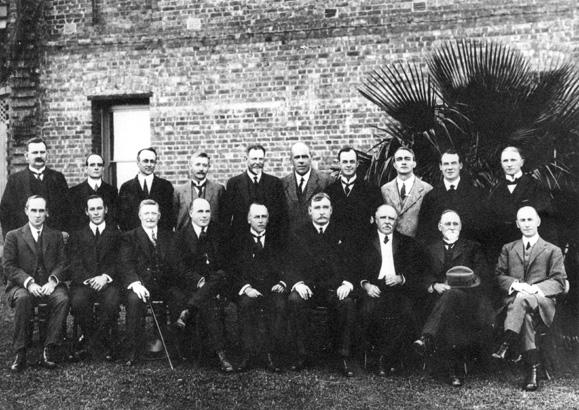
Attendees of the Interstate Forestry Conference 1917. Stoward is in the back row, fourth from left.

Frederick Stoward (1866–14 December 1931) was the Government Botanist with the Department of Agriculture in Western Australia from 1911 to 1917.

Born at Axbridge, Somerset, England, he was a member of the Hardy family famous for the Hardy Wine Company. He emigrated to Australia when he was about 15 years old, and was educated at the Universities of Adelaide and Sydney. He returned to England, studying under Adrian Brown at the University of Birmingham, where he gained his DSc. He later studied at the Pasteur Institute in Paris, and on returning to Australia he was appointed Government Vegetable Pathologist in Western Australia. After several years he won a position in the serum laboratory at the Royal Park Laboratories in Melbourne, before taking up the position of Government Botanist with the Department of Agriculture in 1911. In 1917 he retired, returning to the family wine business in South Australia. He died in Kensington Gardens, Adelaide.

Stoward specialised in fermentation and other chemical processes, publishing papers like On the Influence Exercised by certain Acids on the Inversion of Saccharose by Sucrase and On Endospermic Respiration in Certain Seeds. He did not publish any taxa, and so does not have a botanical author abbreviation. He did, however, collect the type of Eucalyptus stowardii, which was named in Stoward's honour by Joseph Maiden in 1917.
