= Arrowsmith, Western Australia =

Locality in Mid West region of Western Australia

Arrowsmith
- Town
- Interactive map of Arrowsmith
- Coordinates: 29°34′16″S 115°04′05″E
- Country: Australia
- State: Western Australia
- LGA: Shire of Irwin
- Location: 45 km (28 mi) SSE of Dongara; 335 km (208 mi) N of Perth

Government
  - State electorate: Moore
  - Federal division: Durack

Area
  - Total: 821.7 km^{2} (317.3 sq mi)
- Elevation: 39 m (128 ft)

Population
  - Total: 17 (SAL 2021)
- Postcode: 6525

Arrowsmith is a locality in the Mid West region of Western Australia. Its local government area is the Shire of Irwin and it is located 45 kilometres (28 mi) from the town of Dongara.
