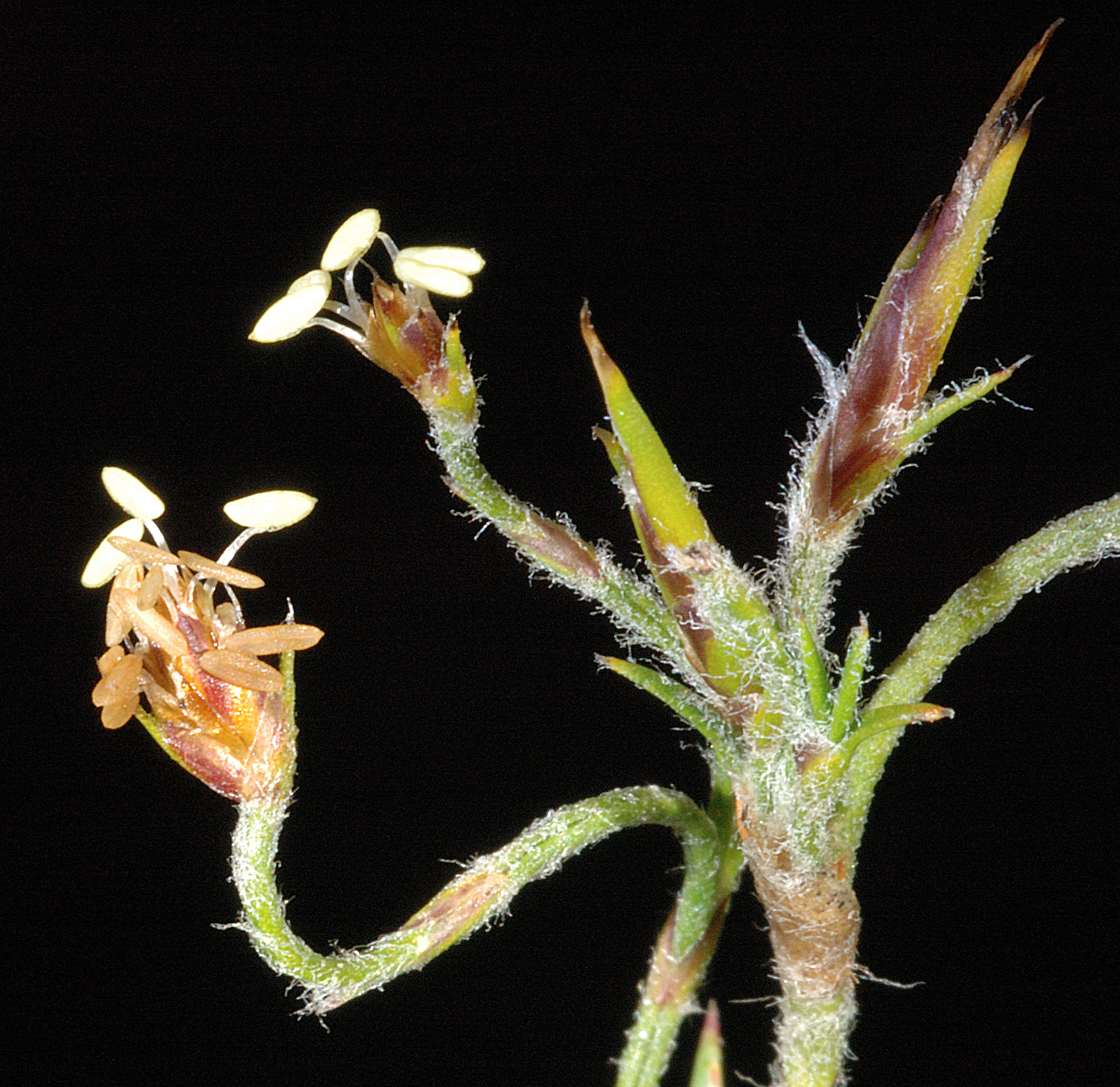
- Desmocladus flexuosus
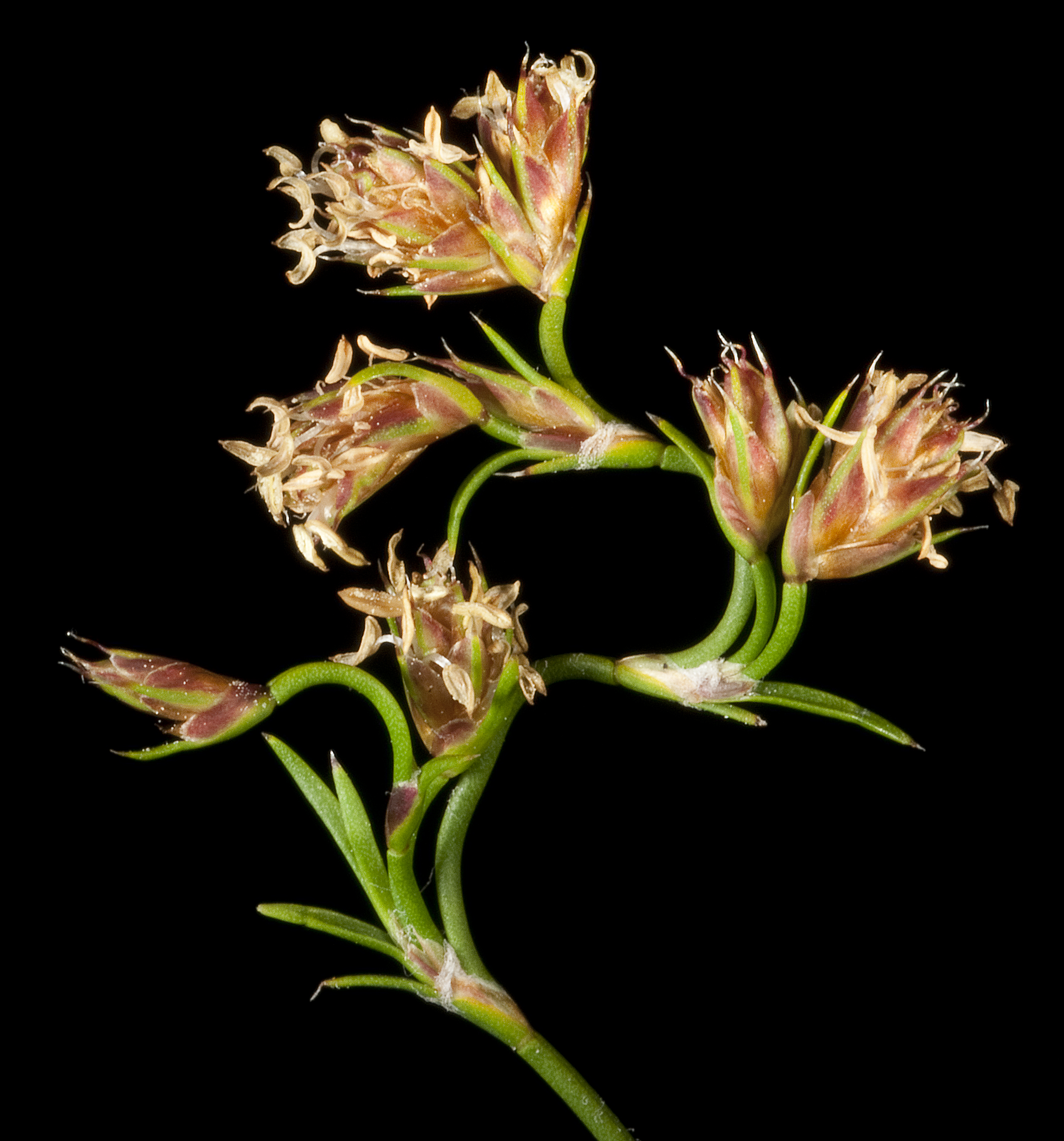
- Desmocladus sp.

Scientific classification
- Kingdom: Plantae
- Clade: Tracheophytes
- Clade: Angiosperms
- Clade: Monocots
- Clade: Commelinids
- Order: Poales
- Family: Restionaceae
- Genus: Desmocladus; Nees

Species
- See text

Synonyms
- Harperia W.Fitzg.; Kulinia B.G.Briggs & L.A.S.Johnson; Onychosepalum Steud.

= Desmocladus =

Genus of flowering plants

Desmocladus is a genus of herbs in the family Restionaceae, all species of which are endemic to Australia, and found in Western Australia and South Australia. In this genus, the stems are the principal photosynthesizers.

Species include:

- Desmocladus asper (Nees) B.G.Briggs & L.A.S.Johnson
- Desmocladus austrinus B.G.Briggs & L.A.S.Johnson
- Desmocladus biformis B.G.Briggs & L.A.S.Johnson
- Desmocladus castaneus B.G.Briggs & L.A.S.Johnson
- Desmocladus confertospicatus (Steud.) B.G.Briggs
- Desmocladus diacolpicus B.G.Briggs & L.A.S.Johnson
- Desmocladus elongatus B.G.Briggs & L.A.S.Johnson
- Desmocladus eludens (B.G.Briggs & L.A.S.Johnson) B.G.Briggs
- Desmocladus eyreanus (B.G.Briggs & L.A.S.Johnson) B.G.Briggs
- Desmocladus fasciculatus (R.Br.) B.G.Briggs & L.A.S.Johnson
- Desmocladus ferruginipes (Meney & Pate) B.G.Briggs
- Desmocladus flexuosus (R.Br.) B.G.Briggs & L.A.S.Johnson
- Desmocladus glomeratus K.W.Dixon & Meney
- Desmocladus lateriflorus (W.Fitzg.) B.G.Briggs
- Desmocladus lateriticus B.G.Briggs & L.A.S.Johnson
- Desmocladus laxiflorus (Steud.) B.G.Briggs
- Desmocladus microcarpus (Meney & Pate) B.G.Briggs
- Desmocladus myriocladus (Gilg) B.G.Briggs & L.A.S.Johnson
- Desmocladus nodatus (B.G.Briggs & L.A.S.Johnson) B.G.Briggs
- Desmocladus parthenicus B.G.Briggs & L.A.S.Johnson
- Desmocladus quiricanus B.G.Briggs & L.A.S.Johnson
- Desmocladus semiplanus B.G.Briggs & L.A.S.Johnson
- Desmocladus virgatus (Benth.) B.G.Briggs & L.A.S.Johnson

== Gallery ==
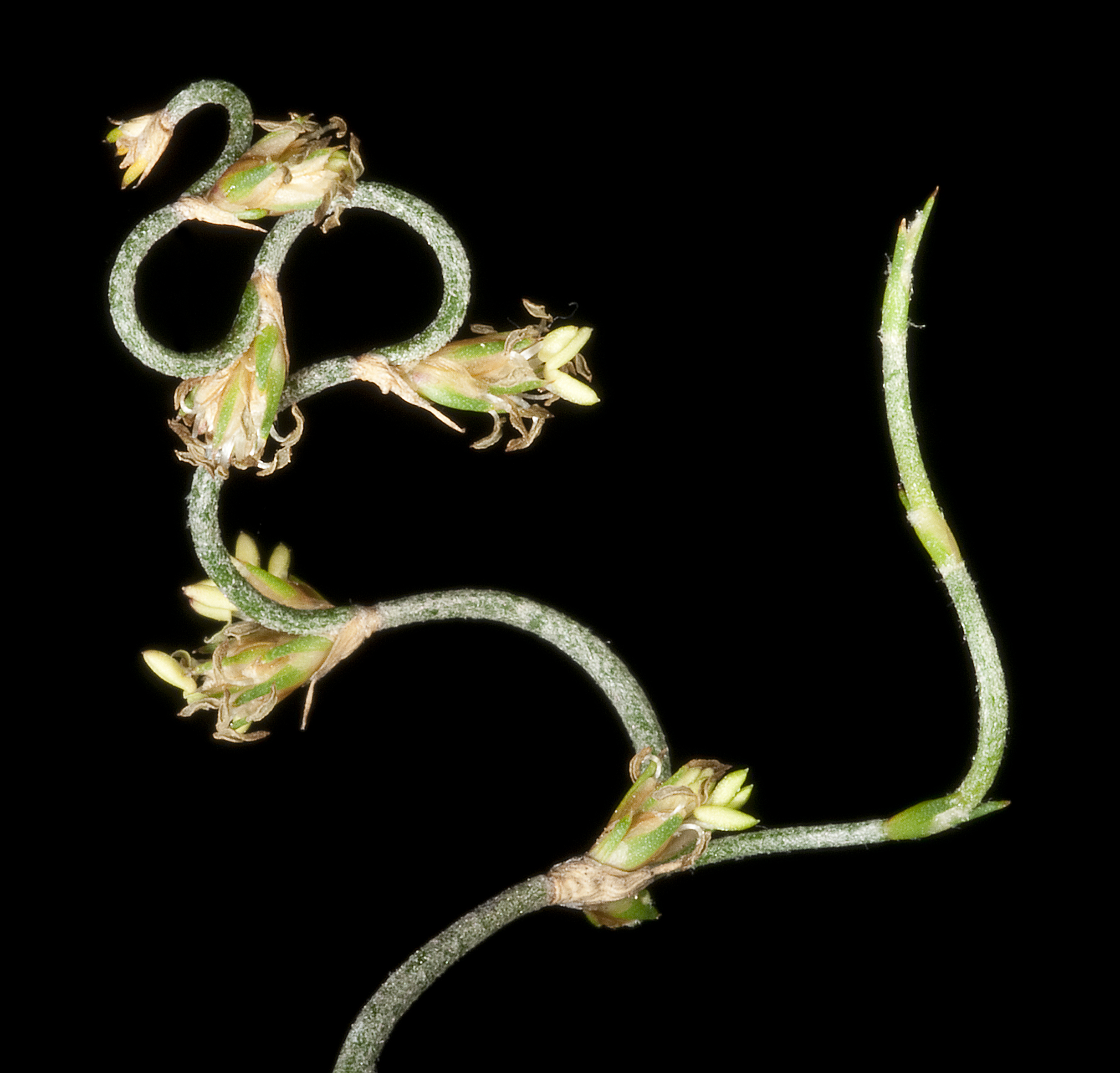

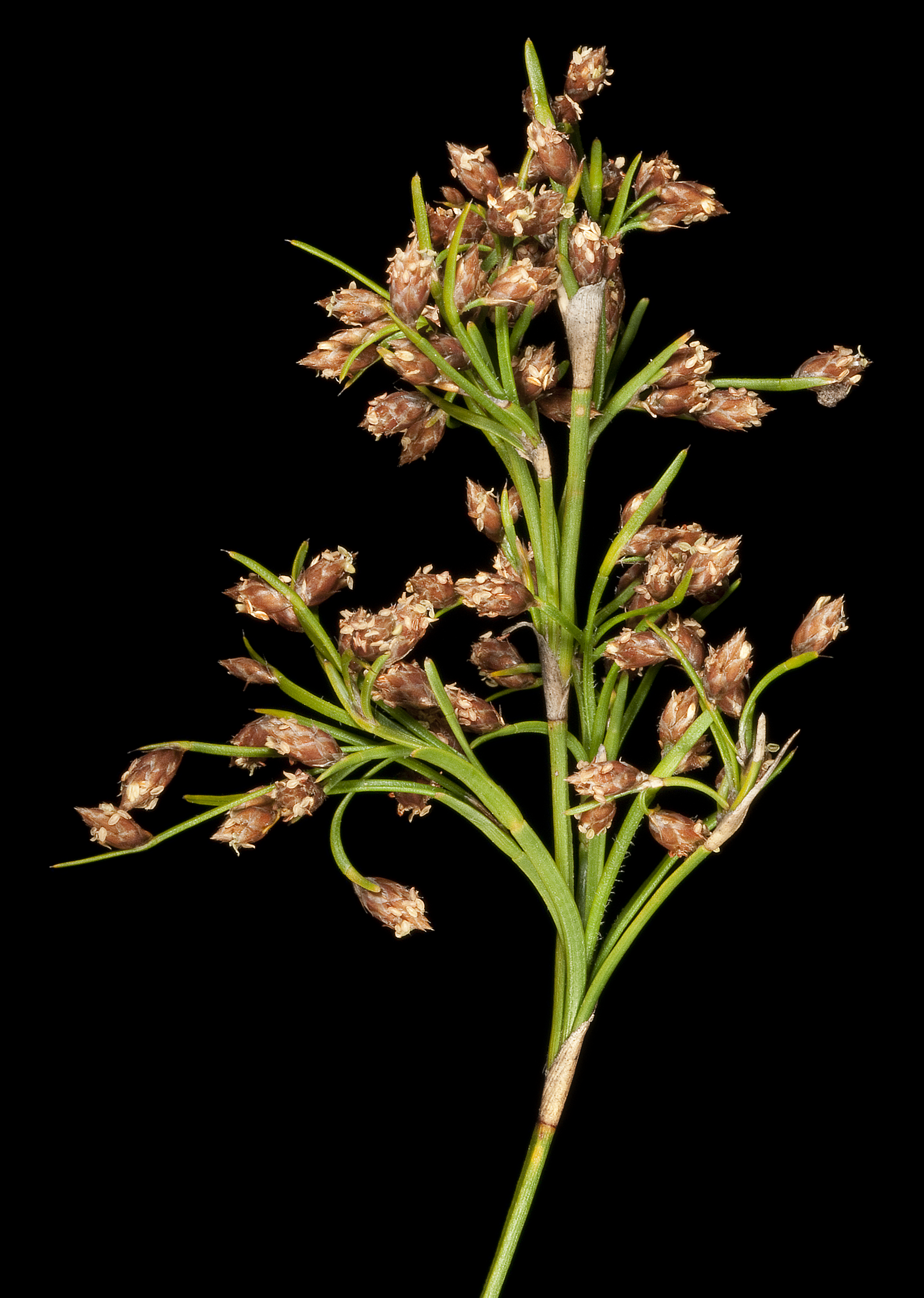

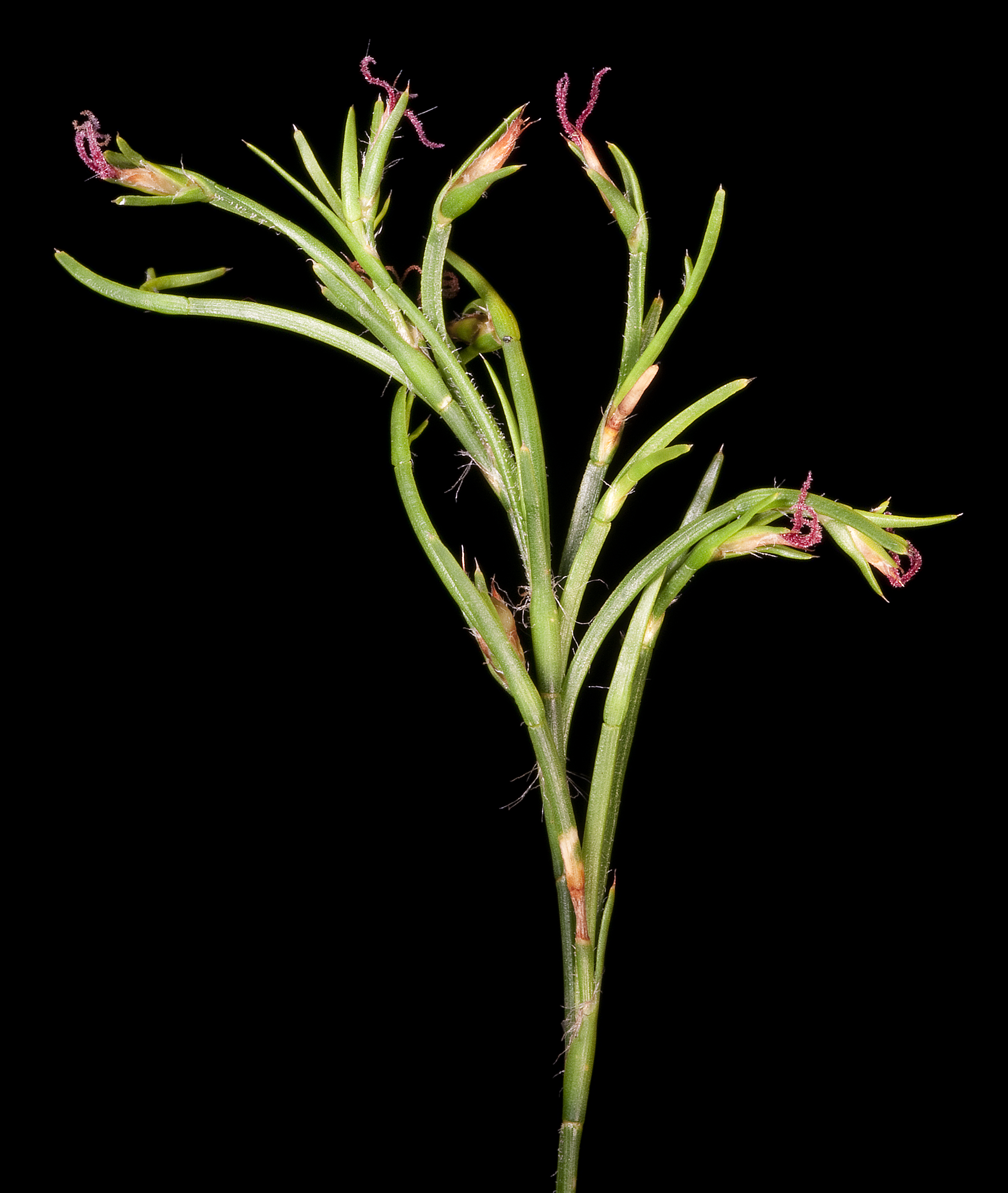

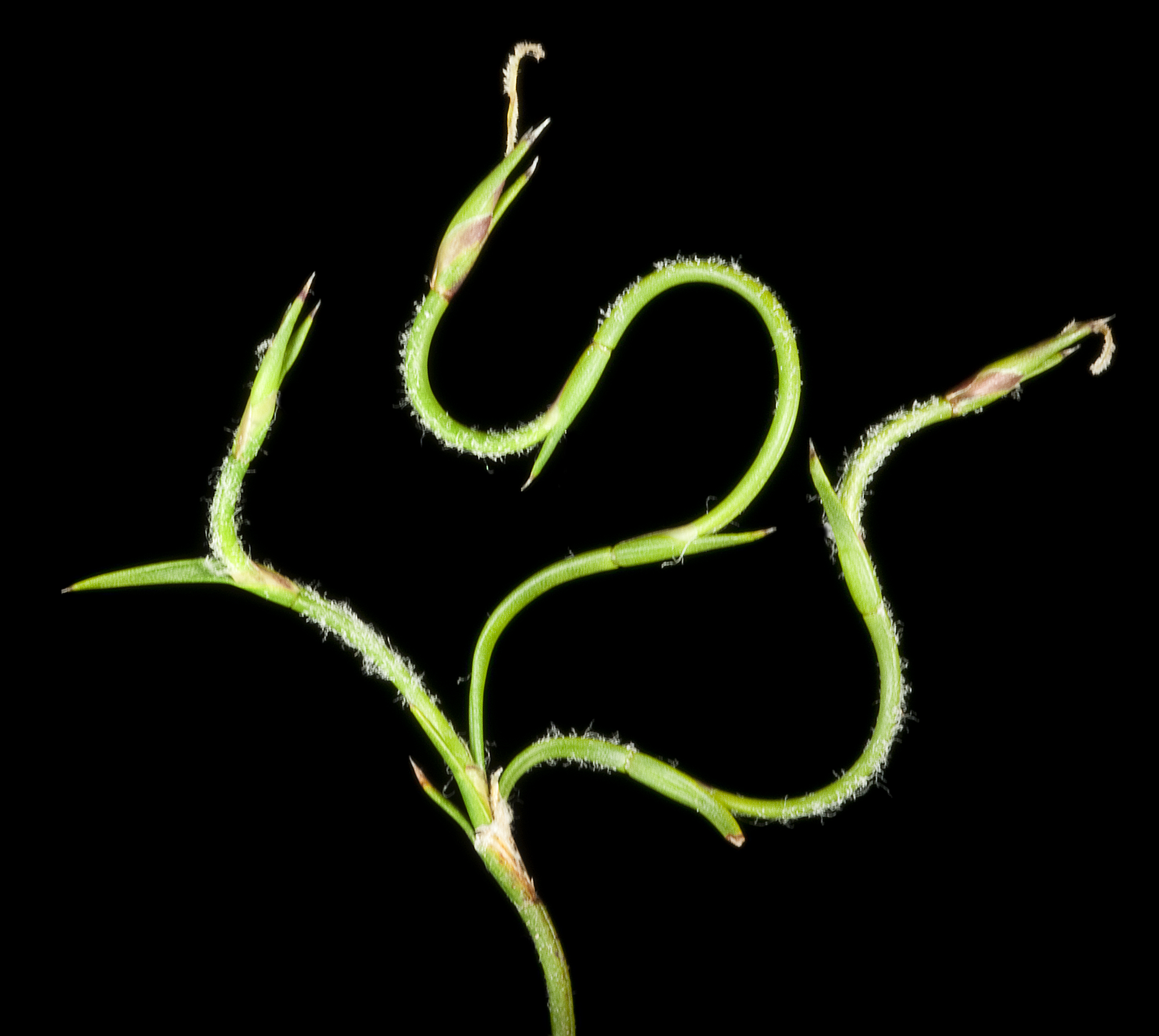
