= Goodenia pedicellata =

Conservation status
- Priority One — Poorly Known Taxa (DEC)

Scientific classification
- Kingdom: Plantae
- Clade: Tracheophytes
- Clade: Angiosperms
- Clade: Eudicots
- Clade: Asterids
- Order: Asterales
- Family: Goodeniaceae
- Genus: Goodenia
- Species: G. pedicellata

Binomial name
- Goodenia pedicellata L.W.Sage & K.W.Dixon

Species of plant

Goodenia pedicellata is a species of flowering plant in the family Goodeniaceae and endemic to the Pilbara region of Western Australia. It is a perennial herb with a single stem, egg-shaped to trowel-shaped leaves with the narrower end towards the base, and racemes of yellow flowers on unusually long pedicels.

== Description ==
Goodenia pedicellata is a perennial herb that typically grows to a height of 25 cm (9.8 in) with a single, hairy stem. The leaves are arranged in a rosette at the base of the plant and on the ends of the stem and are egg-shaped to trowel-shaped with the narrower end towards the base, 50 mm (2.0 in) long (including the petiole), and 15 mm (0.59 in) wide. The flowers are arranged in a raceme, each flower on a pedicel up to about 150 mm (5.9 in) long with leaf-like bracts at the base. The sepals are lance-shaped, about 3.5 mm (0.14 in) long and the corolla yellow with purplish lines and up to about 16 mm (0.63 in) long. The lower lobes of the corolla are about 5 mm (0.20 in) long with wings about 2 mm (0.079 in) wide. Flowering has been observed in late June and the fruit is a more or less elliptic capsule about 6 mm (0.24 in) long.

== Taxonomy and naming ==
Goodenia pedicellata was first formally described in 2005 by Leigh William Sage and Kingsley Wayne Dixon in the journal Nuytsia from material collected by Dixon near a tributary of the Oakover River in 2002. The specific epithet (pedicellata) is a reference to the plant's "long and persistent pedicels".

== Distribution and habitat ==
This goodenia grows on rocky slopes and the tops of small hills in the Pilbara biogeographic region in the north-west of Western Australia.

== Conservation status ==
Goddenia pedicellata is classified as "Priority One" by the Government of Western Australia Department of Parks and Wildlife, meaning that it is known from only one or a few locations which are potentially at risk.
