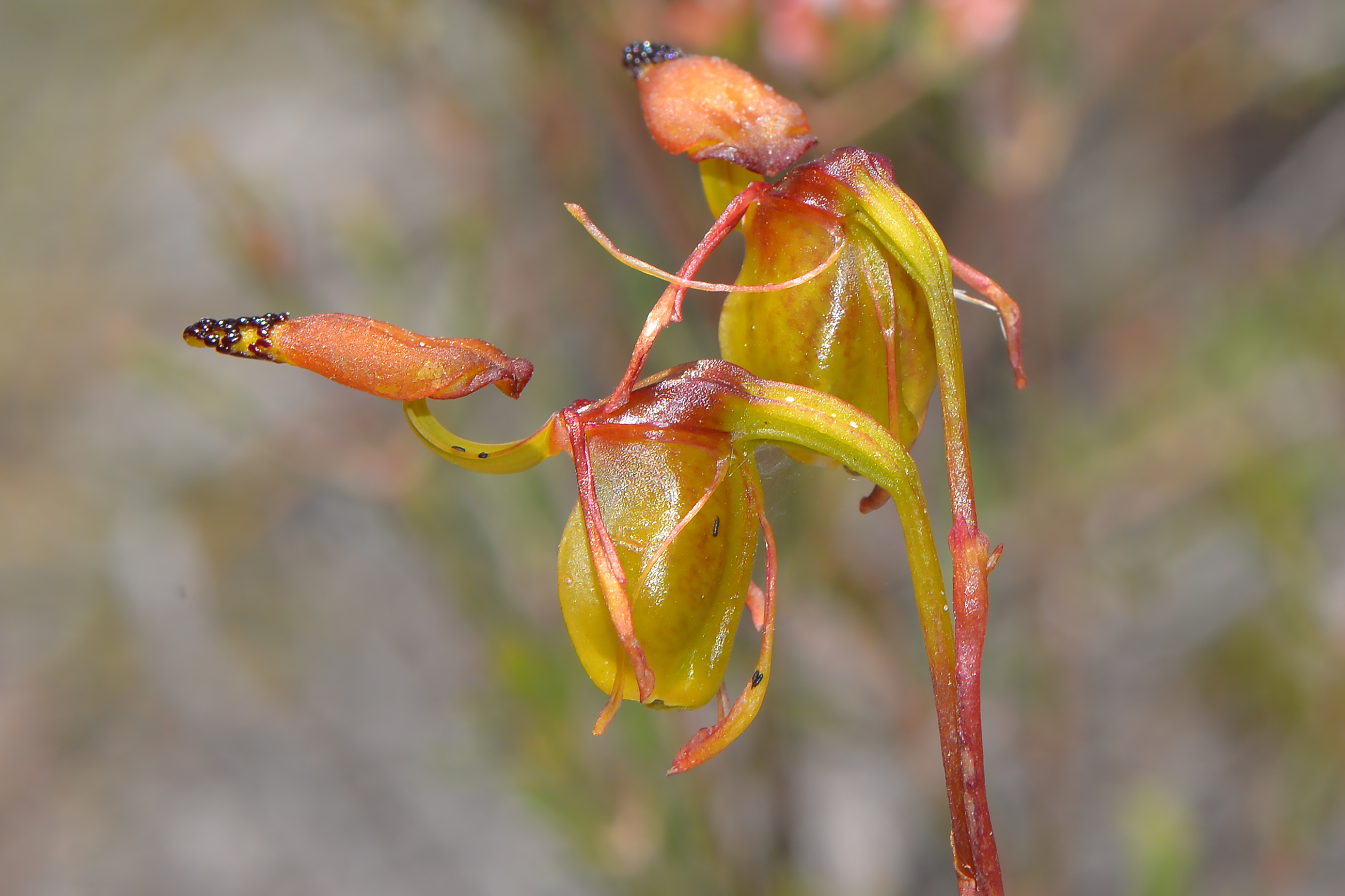
- in Badgingarra NP

Conservation status
- Declared rare (DEC)

Scientific classification
- Kingdom: Plantae
- Clade: Tracheophytes
- Clade: Angiosperms
- Clade: Monocots
- Order: Asparagales
- Family: Orchidaceae
- Subfamily: Orchidoideae
- Tribe: Diurideae
- Genus: Caleana
- Species: C. dixonii

Binomial name
- Caleana dixonii (Hopper & A.P.Br.) M.A.Clem.

Synonyms
- Paracaleana dixonii Hopper & A.P.Br.

= Caleana dixonii =

Sandplain duck orchid

Species of flowering plant

Caleana dixonii, commonly known as the sandplain duck orchid is a rare species of orchid endemic to the south-west of Western Australia. It has a single smooth leaf and a single greenish yellow and fawn-coloured flower. It is distinguished by its flattened labellum with calli only near the tip of the labellum and its preference for growing on sandplains.

== Description ==
Caleana dixonii has a single smooth, dull green to dull red leaf, 20–40 mm (0.8–2 in) long and 4–6 mm (0.16–0.24 in) wide. The leaf is usually withered by flowering time. Usually only one greenish-yellow and fawn-coloured flower, 20–25 mm (0.8–1 in) long and 12–16 mm (0.5–0.6 in) wide is borne on a flowering stem 130–180 mm (5–7 in) high. The dorsal sepal, lateral sepals and petals are narrow and hang downwards with the dorsal sepal pressed against the column which has broad wings, forming a bucket-like shape. About one-third of the outer part of the labellum is covered with glossy black glands or calli and the labellum has a flattened top. Flowering occurs from late October to early December.

== Taxonomy and naming ==
The sandplain duck orchid was first formally described in 2006 by Stephen Hopper and Andrew Brown who gave it the name Paracaleana dixonii. The description was published in Australian Systematic Botany. In 2014, based on molecular studies, Joseph Miller and Mark Clements transferred all the species previously in Paracaleana to Caleana so that the present species became Caleana dixonii. The specific epithet (dixonii) honours Kingsley Dixon, the science director at Kings Park and Botanic Garden, who was the first to recognise this species as distinct.

== Distribution and habitat ==
Caleana dixonii grows in sandy shrubland between Dongara and the Moore River National Park in the Geraldton Sandplains and Swan Coastal Plain biogeographic regions.

== Conservation ==
Caleana dixonii (as Paracaleana dixonii) is classified as "Threatened Flora (Declared Rare Flora — Extant)" by the Department of Environment and Conservation (Western Australia)
