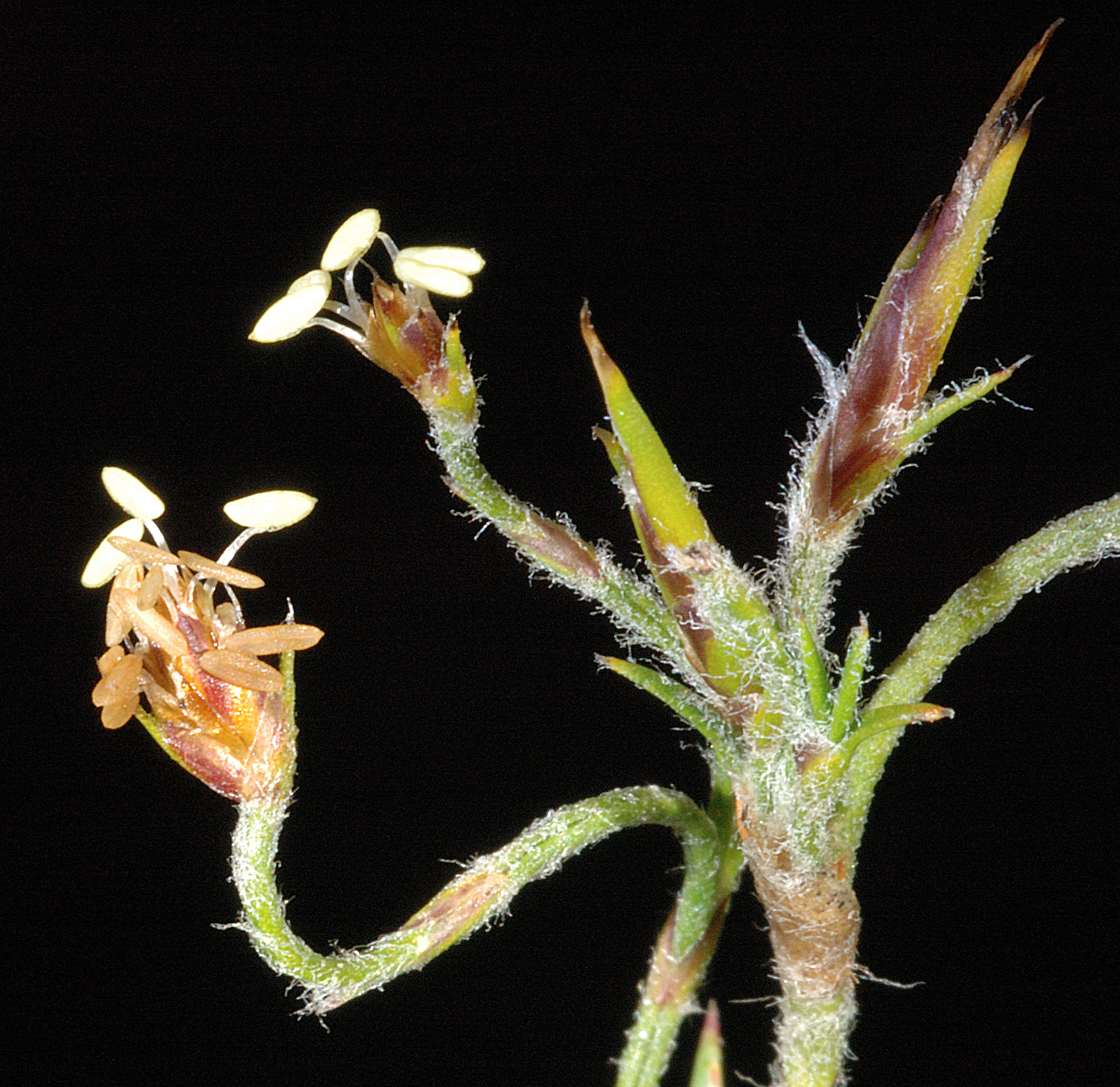
- Desmocladus flexuosus

Scientific classification
- Kingdom: Plantae
- Clade: Tracheophytes
- Clade: Angiosperms
- Clade: Monocots
- Clade: Commelinids
- Order: Poales
- Family: Restionaceae
- Genus: Desmocladus
- Species: D. flexuosus

Binomial name
- Desmocladus flexuosus (R.Br.) B.G.Briggs & L.A.S.Johnson
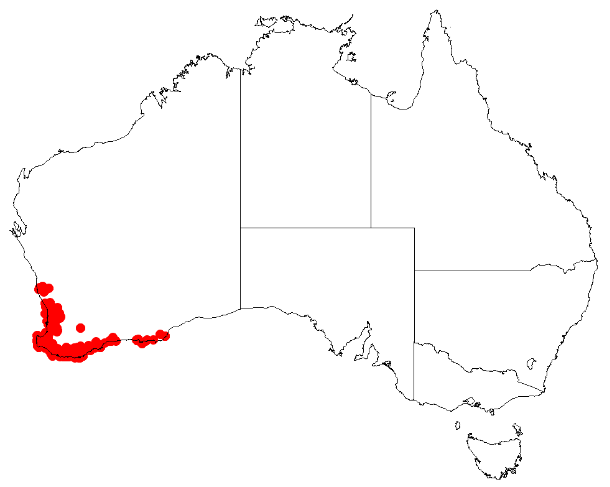
- Occurrence from AVH

= Desmocladus flexuosus =

Species of flowering plant

Desmocladus flexuosus is a rhizomatous, sedge-like herb in the Restionaceae family, endemic to south-west Western Australia.

== Taxonomy ==
It was first described in 1810 by Robert Brown as Restio flexuosus, but in 1998 Barbara Briggs and L.A.S.Johnson reassigned it to the genus, Desmocladus.
