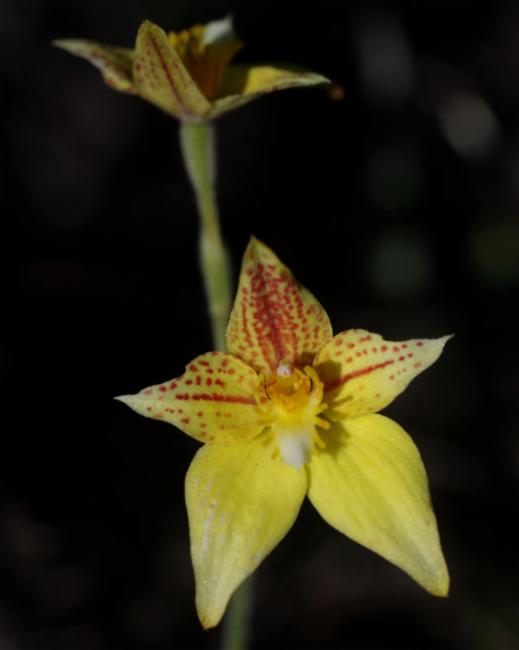
- C. flava subsp. maculata growing in Depot Hill Reserve near Mingenew

Scientific classification
- Kingdom: Plantae
- Clade: Tracheophytes
- Clade: Angiosperms
- Clade: Monocots
- Order: Asparagales
- Family: Orchidaceae
- Subfamily: Orchidoideae
- Tribe: Diurideae
- Genus: Caladenia
- Species: C. flava
- Subspecies: C. f. subsp. maculata

Trinomial name
- Caladenia flava subsp. maculata Hopper & A.P.Br.

= Caladenia flava subsp. maculata =

Kalbarri cowslip orchid

Subspecies of orchid

Caladenia flava subsp. maculata, commonly known as the Kalbarri cowslip orchid, is a species of orchid endemic to the south-west of Western Australia. It has a single, hairy leaf and up to three lemon-yellow flowers with brownish-fawn spots on some parts. It mainly occurs in near-coastal areas north of Geraldton.

== Description ==
Caladenia flava subsp. maculata is a terrestrial, perennial, deciduous, herb with an underground tuber and a single hairy leaf, 50–120 mm (2–5 in) long, 10–12 mm (0.4–0.5 in) wide and tinged with purple on its lower side. Up to three (rarely four) flowers 20–40 mm (0.8–2 in) long and 20–30 mm (0.8–1 in) wide are borne on stalks 100–150 mm (4–6 in) tall. The sepals and petals are lemon-yellow and there are fawnish-brown or red blotches on the dorsal sepal and petals, but not the lateral sepals. The dorsal sepal is erect, 15–25 mm (0.6–1 in) long, 7–10 mm (0.3–0.4 in) wide and the lateral sepals are larger than the dorsal sepal, 20–40 mm (0.8–2 in) long and 7–15 mm (0.3–0.6 in) wide. The petals are 12–24 mm (0.5–0.9 in) long and 6–12 mm (0.2–0.5 in) wide. The labellum is 10–15 mm (0.4–0.6 in) long and 10–13 mm (0.4–0.5 in) wide and has three lobes and a raised plate near its base. There are 8 to 16 short teeth along the sides of the labellum and two rows of calli along its centre. Flowering occurs from July to early September.

This subspecies differs from subspecies flava in having lemon-yellow flowers with fawn-brown or red blotches, 8 to 16 teeth on its labellum and a more northerly distribution. It differs from subspecies sylvestris which has pale yellow sepals and petals which are white towards their tips and have a central line of prominent bright red or pink spots forming a line along the dorsal sepal. Subspecies sylvestris also has a more southerly distribution.

== Taxonomy and naming ==
Caladenia flava was first formally described in 1810 by Robert Brown and the description was published in Brown's book Prodromus Florae Novae Hollandiae et Insulae Van Diemen. In 2001, Stephen Hopper and Andrew Phillip Brown described three subspecies of Caladenia flava including Caladenia flava subsp. maculata and published the descriptions in Nuytsia. The specific epithet (maculata) is a Latin word meaning "spotted" referring to the irregular blotching on the dorsal sepal and petals.

== Distribution and habitat ==
Kalbarri cowslip orchid grows in a range of habitats from granite outcrops to depressions which fill with water in winter. It occurs between Perenjori and Nerren Nerren Station near Kalbarri in the Avon Wheatbelt, Geraldton Sandplains and Yalgoo biogeographic regions.

== Conservation ==
Caladenia flava subsp. maculata is classified as "not threatened" by the Western Australian Government Department of Parks and Wildlife.
