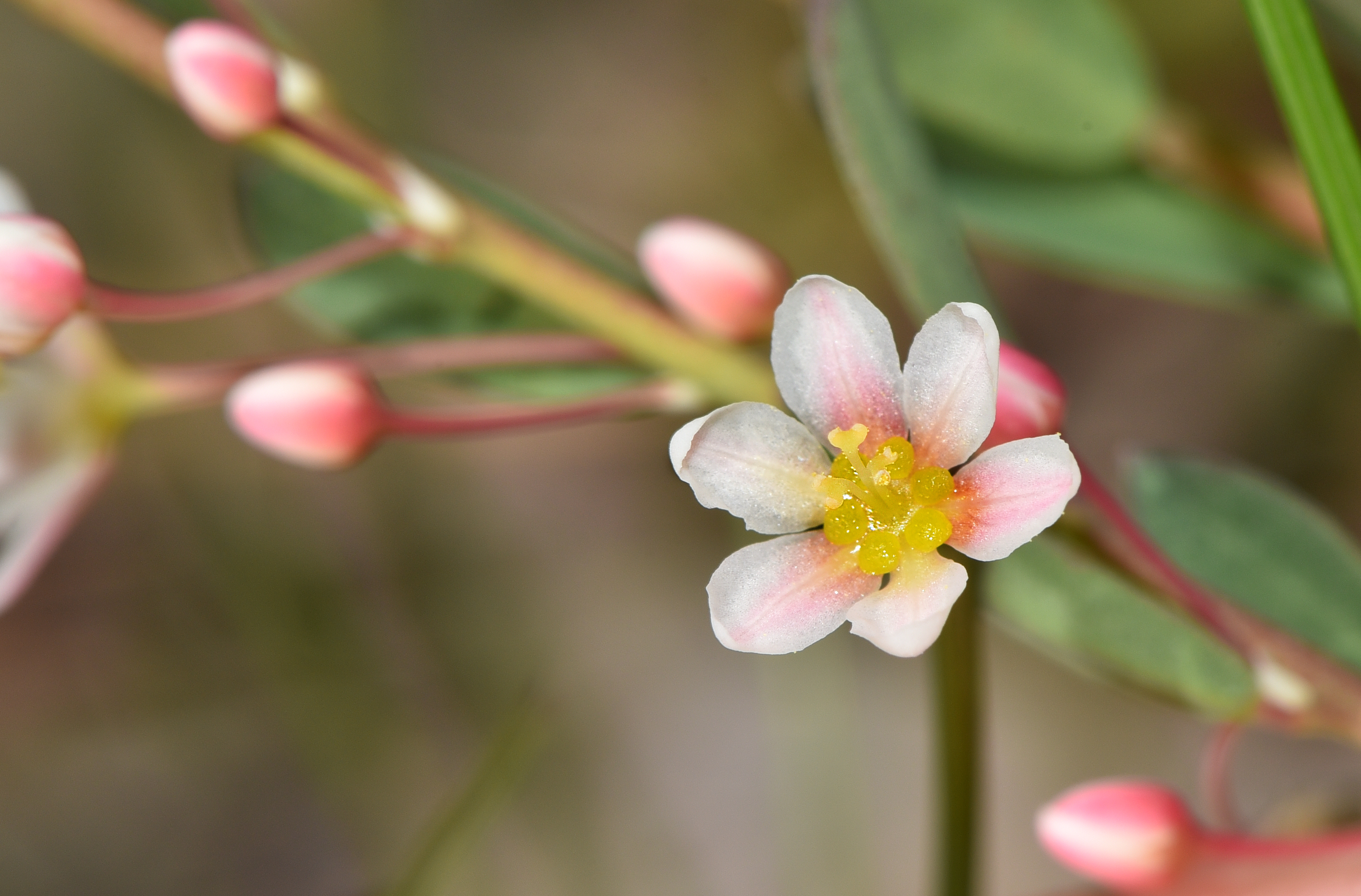

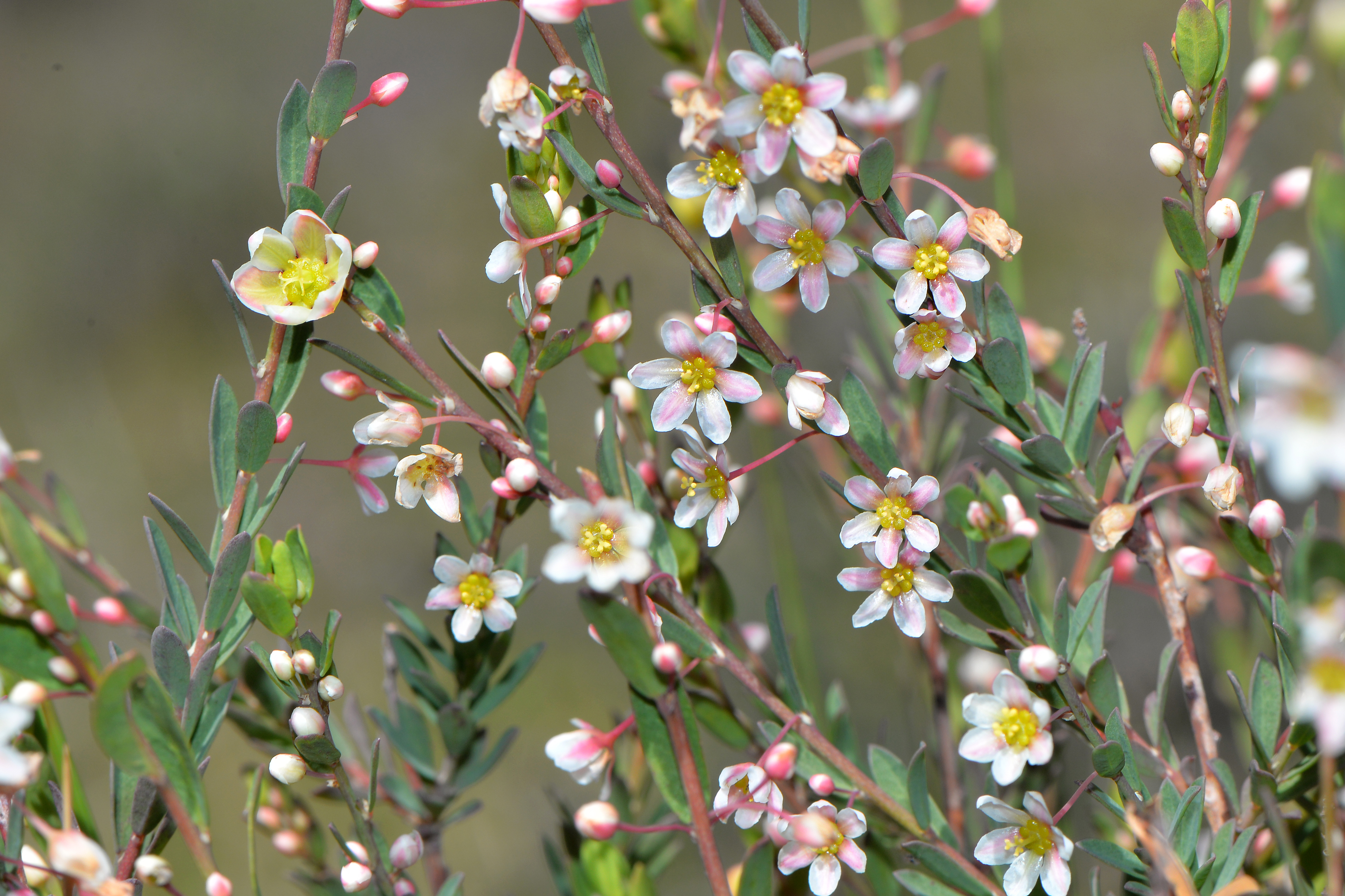

Scientific classification
- Kingdom: Plantae
- Clade: Tracheophytes
- Clade: Angiosperms
- Clade: Eudicots
- Clade: Rosids
- Order: Malpighiales
- Family: Phyllanthaceae
- Genus: Phyllanthus
- Species: P. calycinus

Binomial name
- Phyllanthus calycinus Labill.
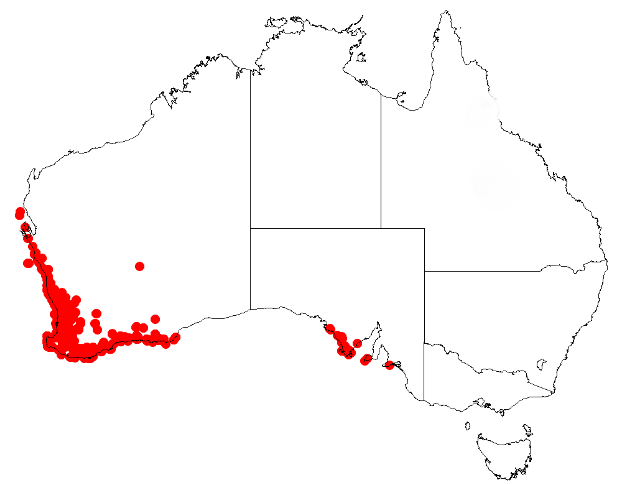
- Occurrence data from Australasian Virtual Herbarium

Synonyms
- List of synonyms Clutia berberifolia Pax; Diasperus calycinus (Labill.) Kuntze; Diasperus cygnorum (Endl.) Kuntze; Phyllanthus calycinus var. genuinus Müll.Arg. Phyllanthus calycinus var. obovatus Müll.Arg. Phyllanthus calycinus var. parviflora Benth. Phyllanthus cygnorum Endl. Phyllanthus cygnorum var. genuinus Müll.Arg. Phyllanthus pimeleoides A.DC. Phyllanthus preissianus Klotzsch; Phyllanthus preissianus var. pimeleoides (A.DC.) Müll.Arg. Phyllanthus pulchellus Endl.

= Phyllanthus calycinus =

Species of plant

Phyllanthus calycinus, known as false boronia and snowdrop spurge, is a small shrub in the family Phyllanthaceae, which grows to heights from 20 cm to 1.2 m, often on sandy soils. It is found in both Western Australia and South Australia. In Western Australia its white-cream to pink flowers may be seen from June to January, and in South Australia, from May to October.

== Description ==
From the key given in Hunter and Bruhl (1997), the following partial description (differentiating it from other Western Australian Phyllanthus species) is derived: The leaves are normal but sometimes reduced. The plant is monoecious. The branchlets are smooth. The sepals of the female flower enlarge to enclose the fruit, which is from 3 to 5.2 mm by 5 to 6 mm, and encases seed which is from 2.5-3.9 mm by 1-8-2.5 mm.

== Taxonomy and naming ==
It was first described in 1806 by Labillardière. The specific epithet, calycinus, is Latin meaning "with a well developed calyx".

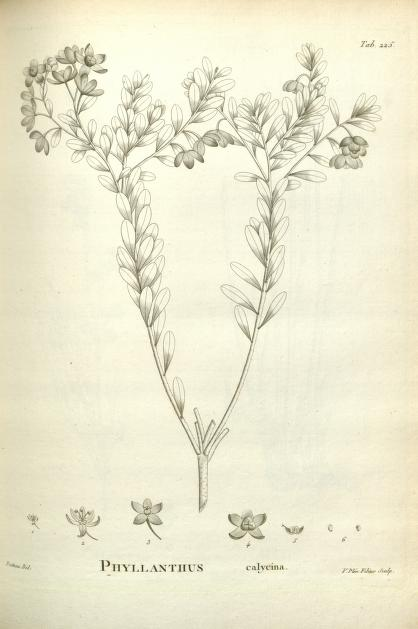
Botanical illustration from 1806
