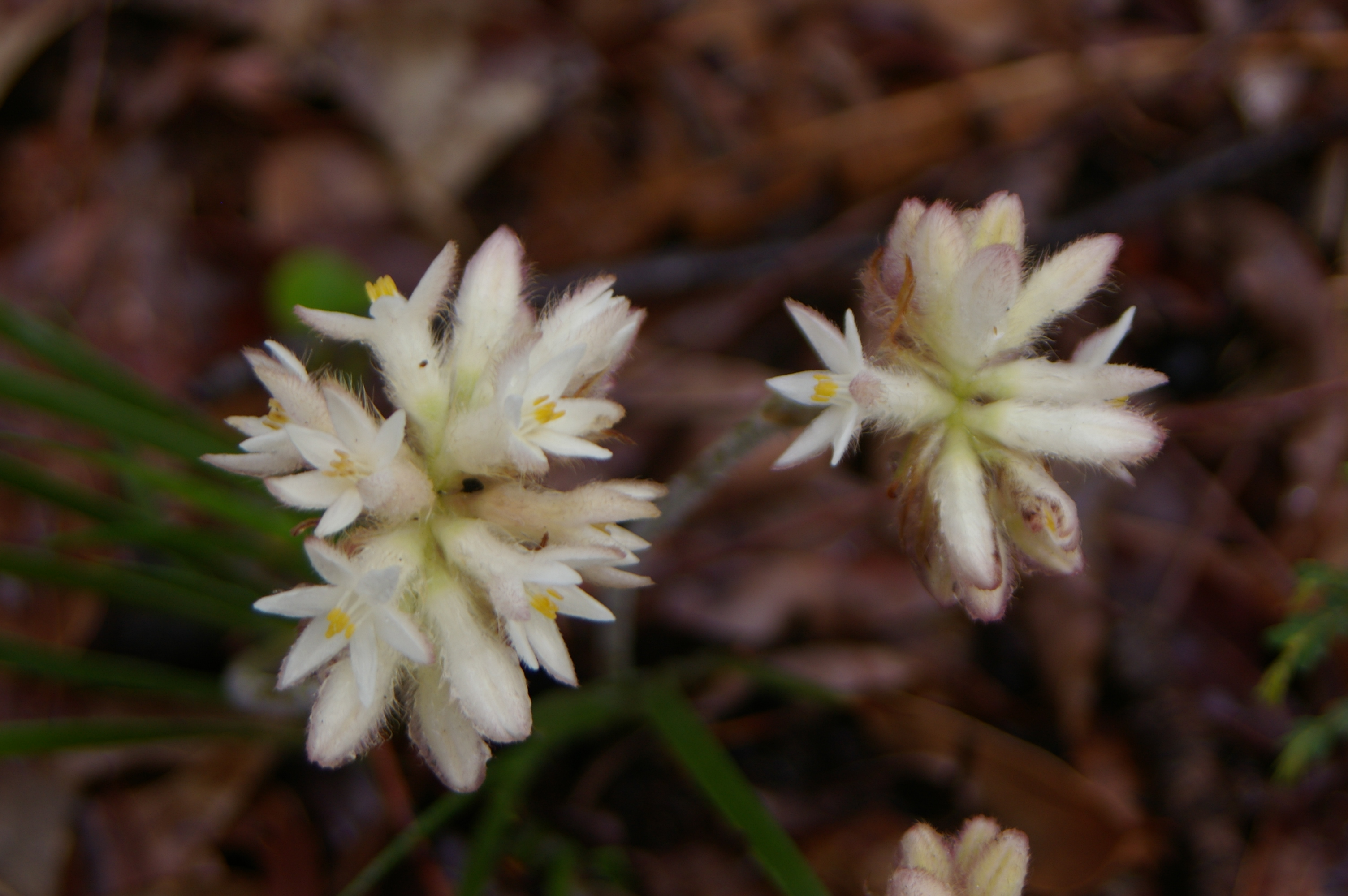
- In Beelu National Park

Scientific classification
- Kingdom: Plantae
- Clade: Tracheophytes
- Clade: Angiosperms
- Clade: Monocots
- Clade: Commelinids
- Order: Commelinales
- Family: Haemodoraceae
- Genus: Conostylis
- Species: C. setosa

Binomial name
- Conostylis setosa Lindl.

= Conostylis setosa =

Species of flowering plant

Conostylis setosa, commonly known as white cottonhead, is a rhizomatous, tufted perennial, grass-like plant or herb in the family Haemodoraceae and is endemic to the south-west of Western Australia. It has flat leaves and white, or pinkish maroon to purple flowers

== Description ==
Conostylis setosa is a rhizomatous, perennial grass-like plant or herb that has small tufts and short stems. The leaves are flat, 150–300 mm (5.9–11.8 in) long, 1.5–4.0 mm (0.059–0.157 in) wide, green with striations and glabrous apart from two ranks of hairs on the edges. The flowers are usually borne on up to four flowering stems 80–350 mm (3.1–13.8 in) long. The flowers are white or pinkish maroon to purple, 12–20 mm (0.47–0.79 in) long with lobes 6.0–10.5 mm (0.24–0.41 in) long. The anthers are 2–4 mm (0.079–0.157 in) long and the style is 8.4–12 mm (0.33–0.47 in) long. Flowering occurs from September to November.

== Taxonomy and naming ==
Conostylis setosa was first formally described in 1840 by John Lindley in his A Sketch of the Vegetation of the Swan River Colony. The specific epithet (setosa) means "bristly".

== Distribution and habitat ==
White cottonhead is locally common between Bindoon and Dwellingup on the Darling Scarp, in the Jarrah Forest and Swan Coastal Plain bioregions in the south-west of Western Australia.

== Conservation status ==
Conostylis setosa is listed as "not threatened" by the Western Australian Government Department of Biodiversity, Conservation and Attractions.
