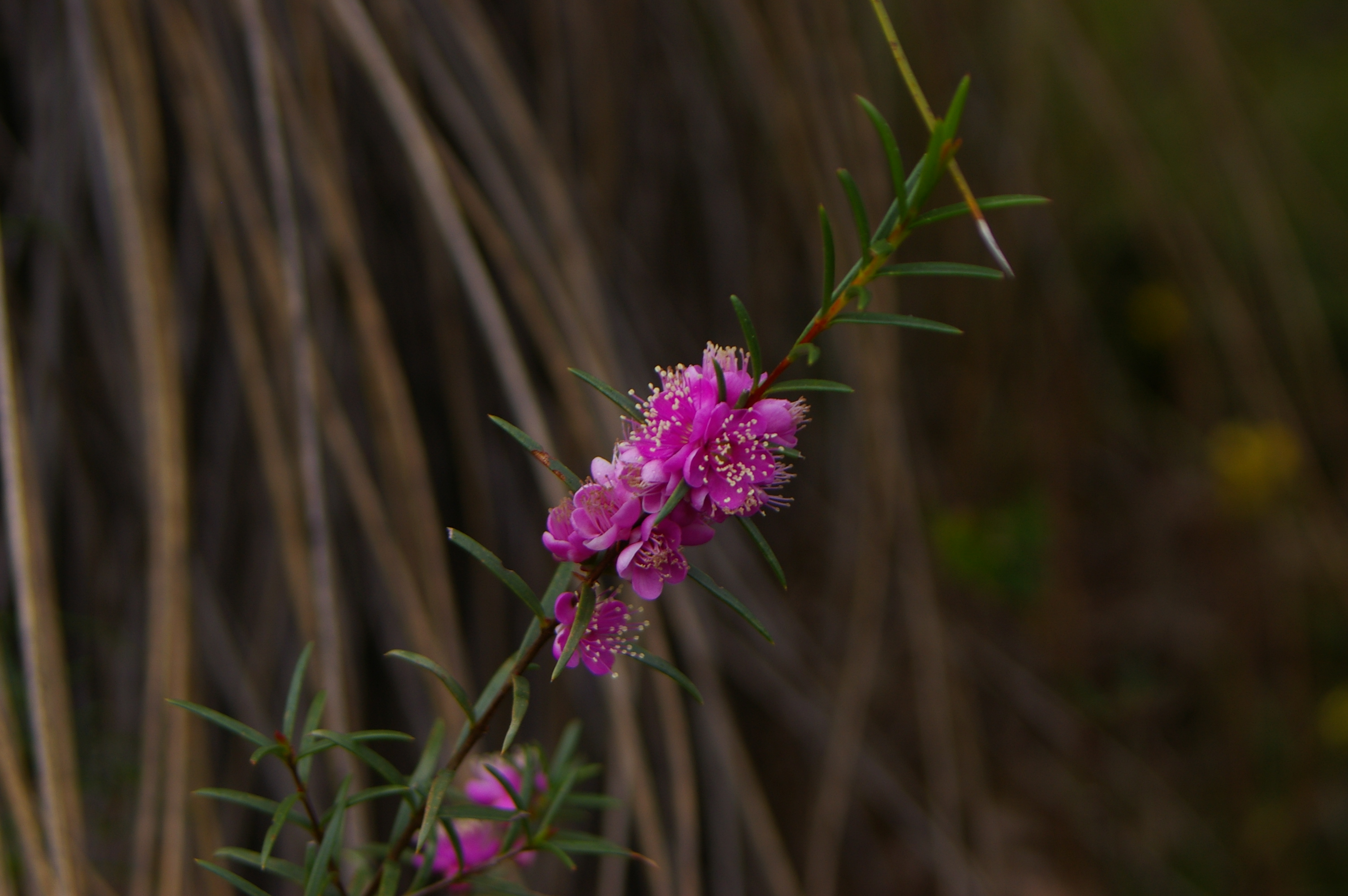
- In John Forrest National Park

Scientific classification
- Kingdom: Plantae
- Clade: Tracheophytes
- Clade: Angiosperms
- Clade: Eudicots
- Clade: Rosids
- Order: Myrtales
- Family: Myrtaceae
- Genus: Hypocalymma
- Species: H. robustum

Binomial name
- Hypocalymma robustum (Endl.) Lindl.

Synonyms
- Leptospermum robustum Endl.

= Hypocalymma robustum =

Swan River myrtle

Species of flowering plant

Hypocalymma robustum, commonly known as Swan River myrtle, is a species of flowering plant in the myrtle family Myrtaceae, and is endemic to the south-west of Western Australia. It is an erect, multistemmed shrub or shrublet with linear to narrowly oblong leaves and pink flowers arranged in pairs in leaf axils, with 35 to 60 stamens.

== Description ==
Hypocalymma robustum is an erect, glabrous shrub or shrublet that typically grows up to 0.3–1.5 m (1 ft 0 in – 4 ft 11 in) high, and has many stems. Its leaves are arranged in opposite pairs, linear to narrowly oblong, 14–25 mm (0.55–0.98 in) long, 1.2–2.5 mm (0.047–0.098 in) wide and flat, covered with small glands. The flowers are borne in pairs in leaf axils and are sessile or on a peduncle up to 3 mm (0.12 in) long. The bracts are small, broadly lance-shaped and the bracteoles are broadly elliptic, 2–3 mm (0.079–0.118 in) long. The sepal lobes are egg-shaped almost round, 2–3 mm (0.079–0.118 in) long and pale pink with glands in the centre. The petals are pink, 4.0–5.5 mm (0.16–0.22 in) long and there are 35 to 70 stamens in several rows, the longest filaments 4.5–6.5 mm (0.18–0.26 in) long and joined at the base. Flowering occurs from June to November and the fruit is 3–4 mm (0.12–0.16 in) long, about 4.5 mm (0.18 in) wide and 3 mm (0.12 in) thick.

== Taxonomy ==
This species was first formally described in 1837 by Stephan Endlicher in Enumeratio plantarum quas in Novae Hollandiae ora austro-occidentali ad fluvium Cygnorum et in sinu Regis Georgii collegit Carolus Liber Baro de Hügel who gave it the name Leptospermum robustum from specimens collected by Hugel near the Swan River. In 1843, John Lindley transferred the species to Hypoclymma as H. robustum in Edwards's Botanical Register.

== Distribution and habitat ==
Hypocalymma robustum grows in woodland in gravelly lateritic and sandy soils in undulating terrain from near Bindoon to Pemberton, including Perth and the Leeuwin-Naturaliste National Park in the Jarrah Forest, Swan Coastal Plain and Warren bioregions of south-western Western Australia.

== Use in horticulture ==
Its attractive flowers and compact size make H. robustum a desirable garden plant. However, it does need a climate where the summers are dry. It requires good drainage and prefers a sunny or partially shaded position and has moderate frost resistance. Propagation is from semi-mature cuttings or seed.
