= Kingsley Dixon =

Australian botanist

Kingsley Dixon AO FTSE
- Born: Kingsley Wayne Dixon; 1954 (age 71–72)
- Citizenship: Australian
- Education: University of Western Australia
- Scientific career
- Fields: Botany
- Institutions: University of Western Australia Curtin University

Kingsley Wayne Dixon is an Australian botanist currently working as a professor at the University of Western Australia. He was the founding Director of Science at Kings Park and Botanic Gardens, and helped to establish the laboratories there as among the world's leading.

== Early life ==
Dixon grew up in the Perth suburb of Morley, Western Australia. He spent his time exploring the bushland that existed in the suburb during his childhood, which encouraged his interest in botany.

== Career ==
Dixon received a Bachelor of Science (Hons) and a PhD from the University of Western Australia (UWA). Dixon was the founding Director of Science at Kings Park and Botanic Gardens from 1982 to 2014. Kingsley was a professor at UWA before taking up a professorship at Curtin University in 2017. As of January 2025, he has returned to UWA as a Professor at the School of Biological Sciences.

One of Dixon's most notable achievements is the 1992 discovery of smoke as a cause for the germination of Australian plants after bushfires. The study, which was published in 1995, applied knowledge which had previously been researched in South Africa to the native plants of his home state.

He later helped to show that plant species in other parts of the world also have germination caused by smoke, showing that this is not exclusive to plants in fire-prone regions. After this, he started a study with scientists from UWA and Murdoch University to discover the specific chemicals in smoke that cause this effect, testing over 4,000 chemicals and eventually discovering a new molecule, named karrikinolide, after "karrik", the Noongar word for "smoke". The discovery was published in Science in 2004.

Dixon featured on David Attenborough's documentary The Private Life of Plants in 2001.

In December 2017, Dixon became a member of the Lotterywest board.

Plant species first described by Dixon include Caladenia rosea, Caladenia lateritica, Desmocladus glomeratus and Rhizanthella johnstonii. Caleana dixonii was first identified as a distinct species by and named after Dixon.

In 2025 Dixon's display of great sun orchids at the Chelsea Flower Show in London was awarded a gold medal, which he compared to "winning the plant Olympics".

== Personal life ==
Dixon owns a 160-acre (65 ha) property near Waroona named "Cypress Farm and Gardens", where he lives with his husband. The property was featured on the show Gardening Australia in 2023, and had Australia's largest maple collection. The property was partially destroyed by a bushfire in March 2024. Dixon was also an owner of the heritage-listed Halliday House in Bayswater between 1984 and 1992, where he worked to restore the garden and house.

== Awards ==
- Golden Gecko Awards for Environmental Excellence (1997, 2000, 2008)
- Australian Minerals Energy Environment Foundations Awards of Environmental Excellence (1992, 1996)
- UWA Chancellor’s Medal (2010)
- UWA Award of Honour (2013)
- Linnean Medal (2013)
- Western Australian Scientist of the Year (2016)
- Fellow of the Australian Academy of Technology and Engineering (2020)
- Officer of the Order of Australia (2023)
