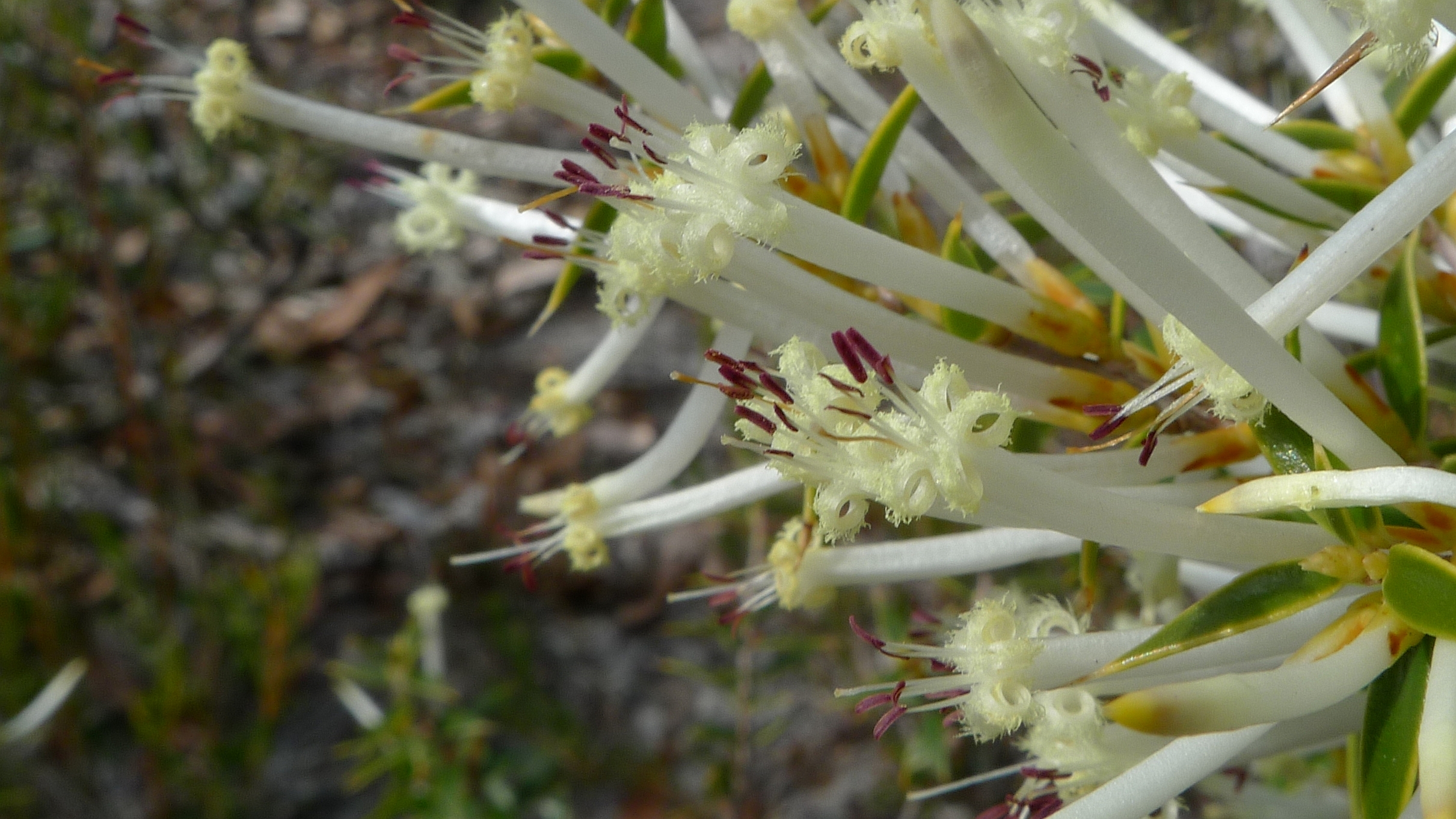
- In Wandoo National Park

Scientific classification
- Kingdom: Plantae
- Clade: Tracheophytes
- Clade: Angiosperms
- Clade: Eudicots
- Clade: Asterids
- Order: Ericales
- Family: Ericaceae
- Genus: Styphelia
- Species: S. tenuiflora

Binomial name
- Styphelia tenuiflora Lindl.

Synonyms
- Soleniscia elegans DC.; Styphelia elegans (DC.) Sond.; Styphelia elegans var. brevior Ewart & Jean White; Styphelia elegans var. lanceolata Sond.

= Styphelia tenuiflora =

Species of shrub

Styphelia tenuiflora, commonly known as common pinheath, is a species of flowering plant in the heath family Ericaceae and is endemic to the south-west of Western Australia. It is an erect shrub with broadly egg-shaped to lance-shaped leaves and whitish-cream, tube-shaped flowers with hairy lobes.

== Description ==
Styphelia tenuiflora is an erect, bushy, rigid, glabrous shrub that typically grows up to 0.2–1 m (7.9 in – 3 ft 3.4 in) high. The leaves are egg-shaped to broadly lance-shaped, about 12 mm (0.47 in) long with a short, almost sessile with a sharply pointed tip. The flowers are arranged in leaf axils, with bracteoles up to 2 mm (0.079 in) long at the base. The sepals are about 5 mm (0.20 in) long, and the petals are creamy white and joined at the base forming a narrow tube 12 mm (0.47 in) long with hairy lobes.

== Taxonomy ==
Styphelia tenuiflora was first formally described in 1839 by John Lindley in his A Sketch of the Vegetation of the Swan River Colony. The specific epithet (tenuiflora) means "thin-flowered".

== Distribution ==
Common pinheath grows on gravelly lateritic soil in the Avon Wheatbelt, Esperance Plains, Jarrah Forest, Mallee and Swan Coastal Plain bioregions of south-western Western Australia.

== Conservation status ==
Styphelia tenuiflora is listed as "not threatened" by the Government of Western Australia Department of Biodiversity, Conservation and Attractions.
