= Pterostylis platypetala =

Broad-petalled snail orchid

Scientific classification
- Kingdom: Plantae
- Clade: Tracheophytes
- Clade: Angiosperms
- Clade: Monocots
- Order: Asparagales
- Family: Orchidaceae
- Subfamily: Orchidoideae
- Tribe: Cranichideae
- Genus: Pterostylis
- Species: P. platypetala

Binomial name
- Pterostylis platypetala D.L.Jones & C.J.French

Species of orchid

Pterostylis platypetala, commonly known as the broad-petalled snail orchid, is a species of orchid endemic to the south-west of Western Australia. It has a rosette of leaves and when flowering, a single green and white flower with relatively wide petals. In ideal conditions it can form colonies of hundreds of plants and often grows under melaleucas on the edge of winter-wet areas.

== Description ==
Pterostylis platypetala is a terrestrial, perennial, deciduous, herb with an underground tuber. It has a leaf rosette 14–25 mm (0.6–1 in) in diameter. Flowering plants have a single green and white flower 15–25 mm (0.6–1 in) long and 8–10 mm (0.3–0.4 in) wide on a flowering stem 50–120 mm (2–5 in) high. There are three or four stem leaves 5–15 mm (0.2–0.6 in) long and 3–8 mm (0.1–0.3 in) wide with their bases wrapped around the flowering stem. The dorsal sepal and petals are fused, forming a hood or "galea" over the column and the dorsal sepal tapers to a point. The petals are wider than those of similar greenhoods and extend beyond the end of the dorsal sepal. The lateral sepals are held closely against the galea, 12–20 mm (0.5–0.8 in) long and have thickened, club-like tips. The labellum is small and not visible from outside the flower. Flowering occurs from May to July.

== Taxonomy and naming ==
Pterostylis platypetala was first formally described in 2015 by David Jones and Christopher French from a specimen collected in the Wandoo National Park and the description was published in Australian Orchid Review. The specific epithet (platypetala) is derived from the Ancient Greek words πλατύς (platús) meaning “flat” and petalon meaning "petal", referring to the broad edges of the petals.

== Distribution and habitat ==
The broad-petalled snail orchid grows in salmon gum and wandoo woodland and under melaleucas on the edge of winter-wet areas. It occurs between Kalbarri and Brookton.

== Conservation ==
Pterostylis platypetala is listed as "not threatened" by the Government of Western Australia Department of Parks and Wildlife.
