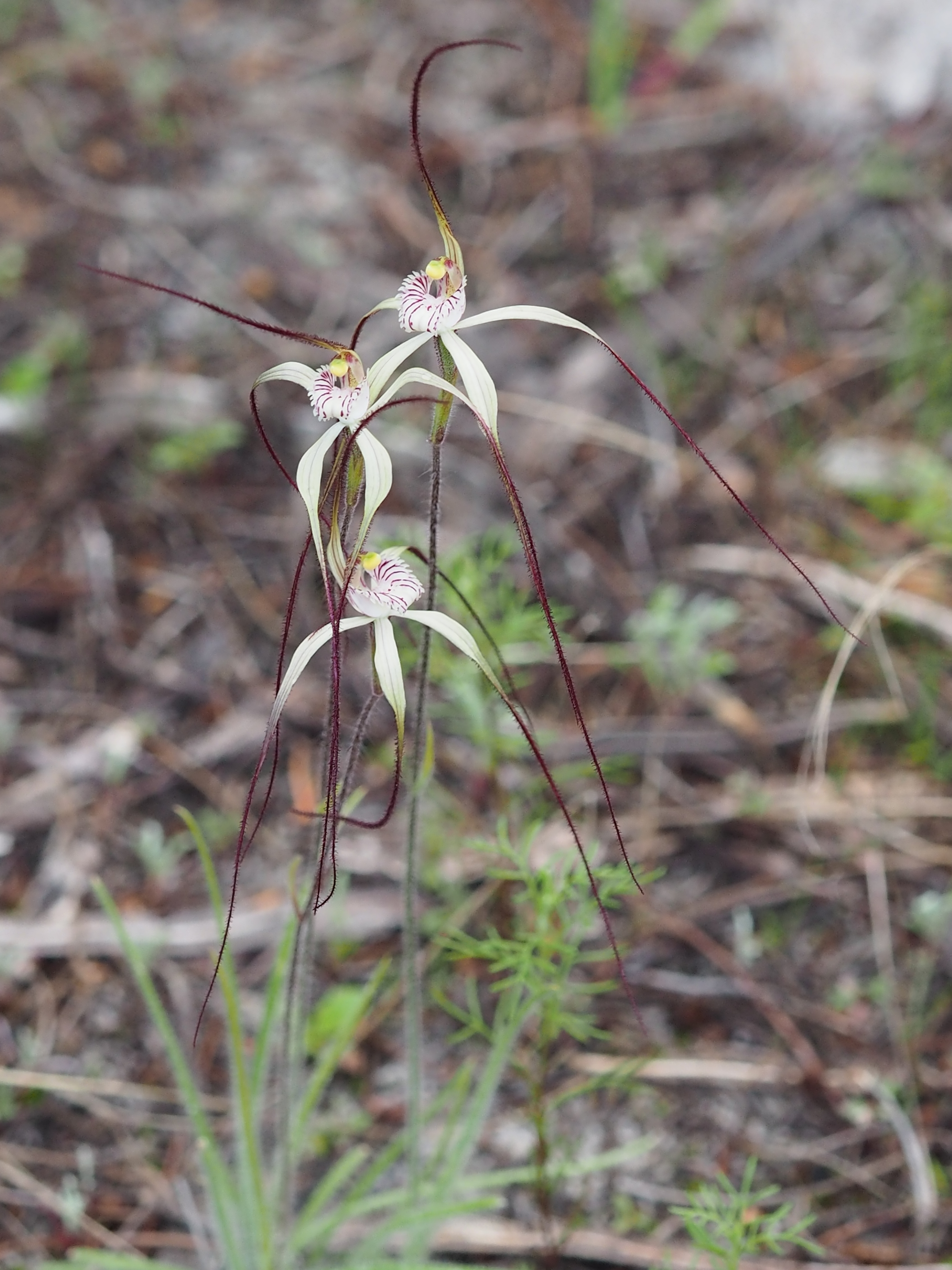

Scientific classification
- Kingdom: Plantae
- Clade: Tracheophytes
- Clade: Angiosperms
- Clade: Monocots
- Order: Asparagales
- Family: Orchidaceae
- Subfamily: Orchidoideae
- Tribe: Diurideae
- Genus: Caladenia
- Species: C. pendens

Binomial name
- Caladenia pendens Hopper & A.P.Br.

Synonyms
- Calonema pendens (Hopper & A.P.Br.) D.L.Jones & M.A.Clem.; Calonemorchis pendens (Hopper & A.P.Br.) D.L.Jones & M.A.Clem.; Calonemorchis pendens (Hopper & A.P.Br.) D.L.Jones & M.A.Clem. subsp. pendens; Jonesiopsis pendens (Hopper & A.P.Br.) D.L.Jones & M.A.Clem.; Jonesiopsis pendens (Hopper & A.P.Br.) D.L.Jones & M.A.Clem. subsp. pendens

= Caladenia pendens =

Species of orchid

Caladenia pendens is a species of flowering plant in the orchid family and is endemic to the south-west of Western Australia. It has a single erect, linear leaf and up to three cream-coloured to dark pinkish-maroon flowers with reddish-purple markings.

== Description ==
Caladenia pendens is a terrestrial, perennial, deciduous, herb with a single erect, linear leaf, 80–130 mm (3.1–5.1 in) long and about 3–5 mm (0.12–0.20 in) wide, with reddish-purple blotches near the base. Up to three cream-coloured to dark pinkish-maroon flowers 100–180 mm (3.9–7.1 in) long and 80–160 mm (3.1–6.3 in) wide are borne on a stalk 150–300 mm (5.9–11.8 in) tall. The sepals and petals have long, thin, drooping, thread-like ends. The dorsal sepal is erect near its base, 60–120 mm (2.4–4.7 in) long and about 2–3 mm (0.079–0.118 in) wide. The lateral sepals are 60–120 mm (2.4–4.7 in) long and 3–5 mm (0.12–0.20 in) wide, the ends drooping vertically, the petals 55–120 mm (2.2–4.7 in) long, 3–4 mm (0.12–0.16 in) wide and similarly drooping. The labellum is 11–19 mm (0.43–0.75 in) long, 9–12 mm (0.35–0.47 in) wide, and cream-coloured with dark maroon lines, blotches and spots. The sides of the labellum have serrated edges or teeth and there are two rows of white, sometimes red-tipped calli along its mid-line. Flowering occurs from August to mid October.

== Taxonomy and naming ==
Caladenia pendens was first described in 2001 by Stephen Hopper and Andrew Phillip Brown in Nuytsia from specimens collected near Hyden in 1985. The specific epithet (pendens) means "hanging down", referring to the lateral sepals and petals.

In the same journal, Hopper and Brown described two subspecies of C. pendens and the names are accepted by the Australian Plant Census:

- Caladenia pendens Hopper & A.P.Br. subsp. pendens - pendant spider orchid, has cream-coloured flowers with petals 8–12 mm (0.31–0.47 in) long and a labellum 15–19 mm (0.59–0.75 in) long from August to early October.
- Caladenia pendens subsp. talbotii Hopper & A.P.Br. - Talbot's spider orchid, has dark, pinkish-maroon flowers with petals 5.5–9 mm (0.22–0.35 in) long and a labellum 11–17 mm (0.43–0.67 in) long from September to mid October.

== Distribution and habitat ==
This spider orchid grows in a variety of habitats, including on granite outcrops, near salt lakes and swamps is found from Watheroo and Wongan Hills south to Wagin and Hyden in the Avon Wheatbelt, Esperance Plains, Geraldton Sandplains, Jarrah Forest, Mallee, Swan Coastal Plain and Warren bioregions of south-western Western Australia. Subspecies talbottii is restricted to winter-wet flats between York and Watheroo in the Jarrah Forest bioregion.

== Conservation ==
Caladenia pendens and its two subspecies are classified as "not threatened" by the Western Australian Government Department of Biodiversity, Conservation and Attractions.
