= Wandoo National Park =

National park in Western Australia

- IUCN category II (national park)
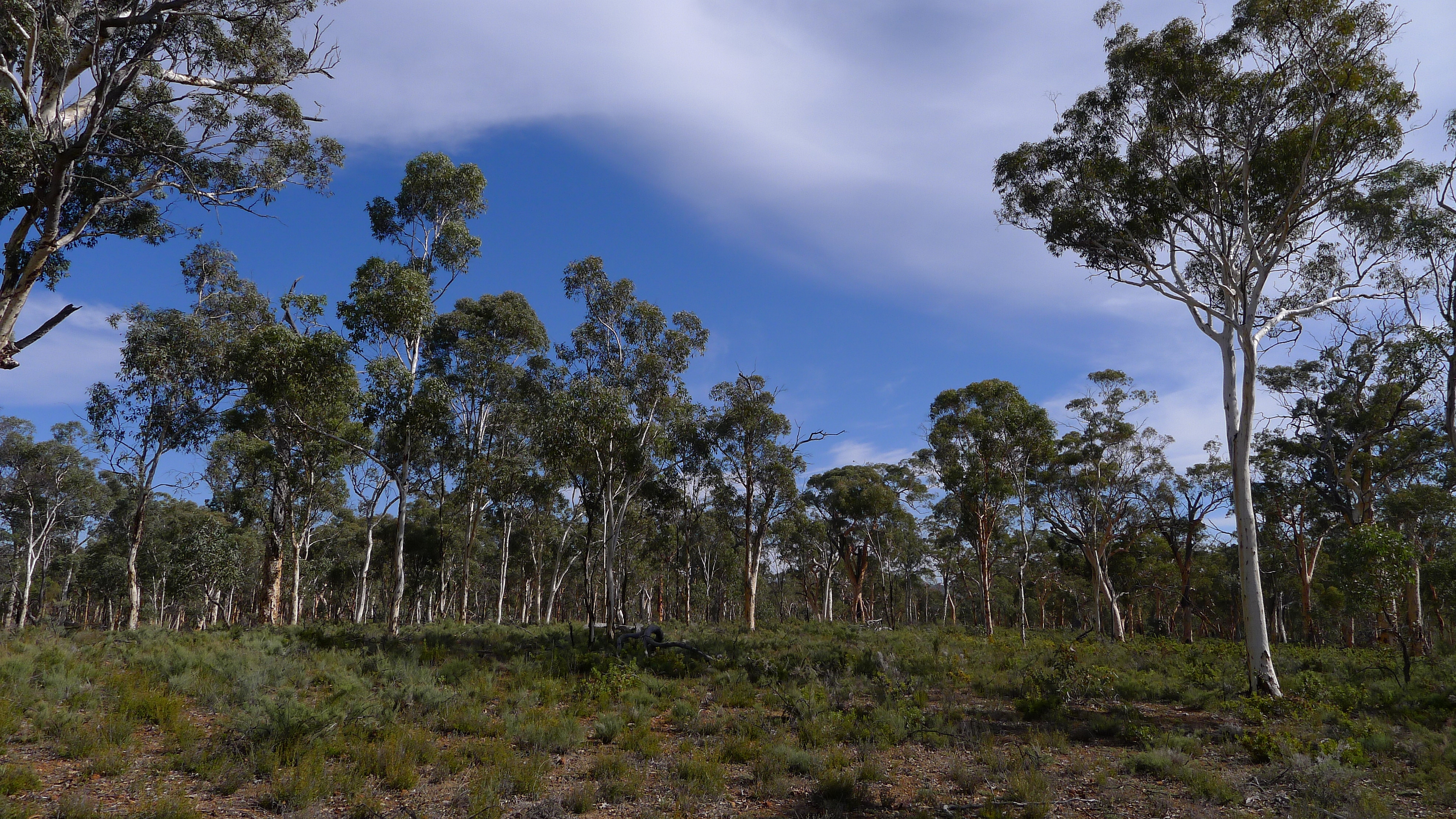
- Wandoo National Park
- Interactive map of Wandoo National Park
- Location: Wheatbelt region, Western Australia
- Coordinates: 32°04′S 116°31′E
- Area: 463.68 km^{2} (179.03 sq mi)
- Designation: National park
- Designated: 2004
- Administrator: Department of Parks and Wildlife

Wandoo National Park is a national park in Western Australia, 80 km east of Perth. It was established in 2004, and has an area of 463.68 km^{2}.
