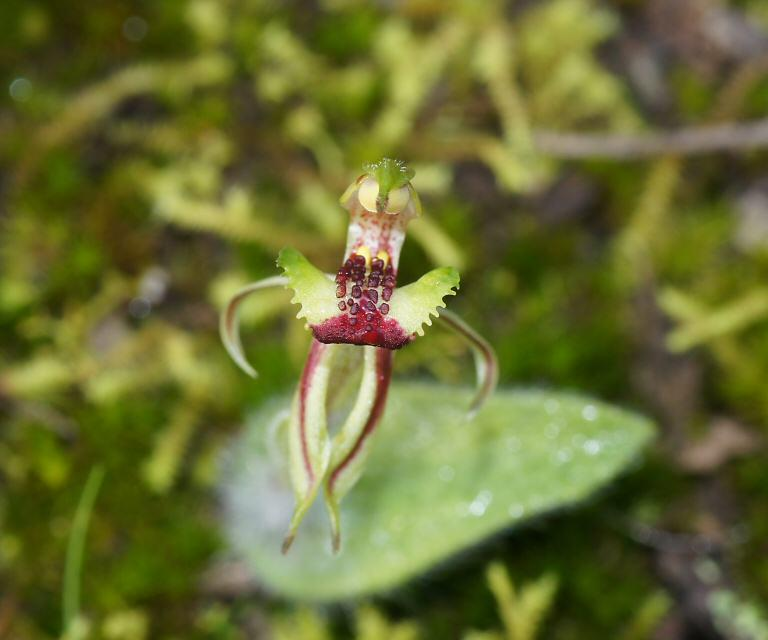

Conservation status
- Endangered (EPBC Act)

Scientific classification
- Kingdom: Plantae
- Clade: Tracheophytes
- Clade: Angiosperms
- Clade: Monocots
- Order: Asparagales
- Family: Orchidaceae
- Subfamily: Orchidoideae
- Tribe: Diurideae
- Genus: Caladenia
- Species: C. amoena

Binomial name
- Caladenia amoena D.L.Jones

Synonyms
- Arachnorchis amoena (D.L.Jones) D.L.Jones & M.A.Clem.; Caladenia concinna auct. non (Rupp) D.L.Jones & M.A.Clem.

= Caladenia amoena =

Charming spider orchid

Species of orchid

Caladenia amoena, commonly known as charming spider orchid, is a plant in the orchid family, Orchidaceae, and is endemic to Victoria, Australia. It is a ground orchid which grows singly or in small groups, has a single dark green, hairy leaf and a single yellowish-green flower with red stripes. It is only known from a few sites and has been classified as endangered.

== Description ==
Caladenia amoena is a terrestrial, perennial, deciduous, herb with an underground tuber with a single, densely hairy, lance-shaped leaf 30–80 mm (1.2–3.1 in) long and 7–9 mm (0.28–0.35 in) wide, often displaying purplish blotches near the base.

A single flower (occasionally two) is borne on a slender spike that stands between 5 centimetres (2.0 in) and 12 centimetres (4.7 in) tall. The dorsal sepal is erect, linear to narrowly lance-shaped, 20–25 mm (0.79–0.98 in) long and about 3 mm (0.12 in) wide, tapering towards a glandular tip about 2 millimetres (0.079 in) long. The lateral sepals are oblong to lance-shaped, 17–23 mm (0.67–0.91 in) long, 3.0–3.5 mm (0.12–0.14 in) wide, and terminate in similar glandular tips. The petals are slightly shorter, about 15–18 mm (0.59–0.71 in) long, and taper to a fine point. The labellum is heart-shaped, curving forward, 9–12 mm (0.35–0.47 in) long and 8–11 mm (0.31–0.43 in) wide when flattened. It has three lobes that are yellowish-green with reddish coloring in the central region. The central lobe has around seven pairs of broad marginal teeth, while the lateral lobes also display smaller teeth near the mid-lobe. Four rows of reddish, foot-shaped calli extend along the mid-line of the labellum, about 3 millimetres (0.12 in) long near the base and gradually decreasing in size toward the tip. The column is 8–9 mm (0.31–0.35 in) long and marked with reddish streaks. Flowering occurs between August and October.

Caladenia amoena is similar to C. concinna, but can be distinguished by its smaller flowers and slightly drooping petals and lateral sepals.

== Taxonomy and naming ==
Caladenia amoena was first formally described by David L. Jones in 1994 and the description was published in Muelleria. The specific epithet (amoena) is a Latin word meaning "pleasant" or "delightful".

== Distribution and habitat ==
Charming spider orchid is only known from two sites, growing in grassy box–ironbark forest in south-central Victoria, on the northern outskirts of Melbourne.

== Conservation ==
Only 45 Caladenia amoena plants were known in 2000 and the species is classified as "endangered" by the Victorian government. It is also classed as "endangered" (EN) under the Australian Government Environment Protection and Biodiversity Conservation Act 1999 (EPBC Act) and a recovery plan has been prepared.
