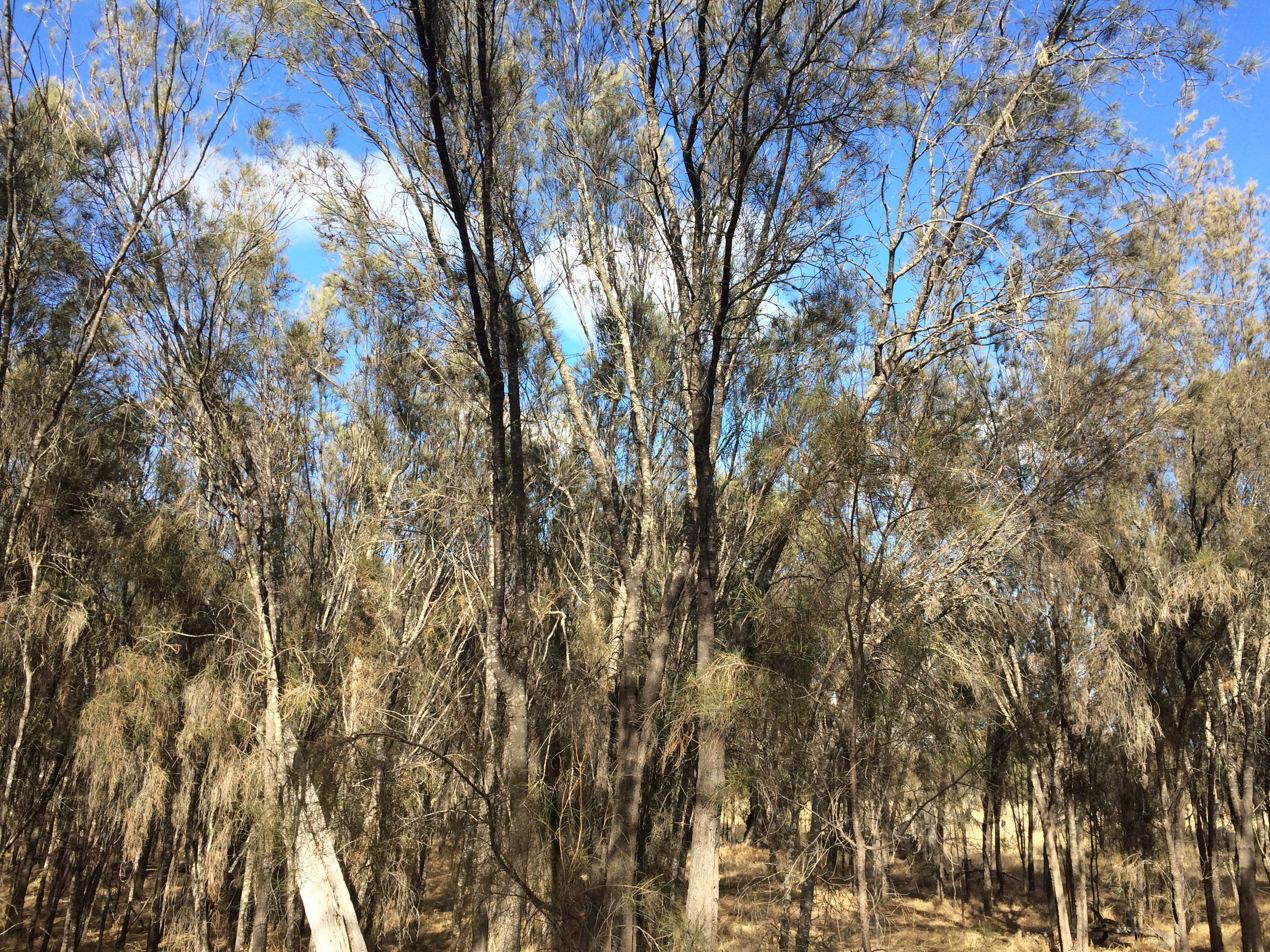
- A. huegeliana woodland near Wagin
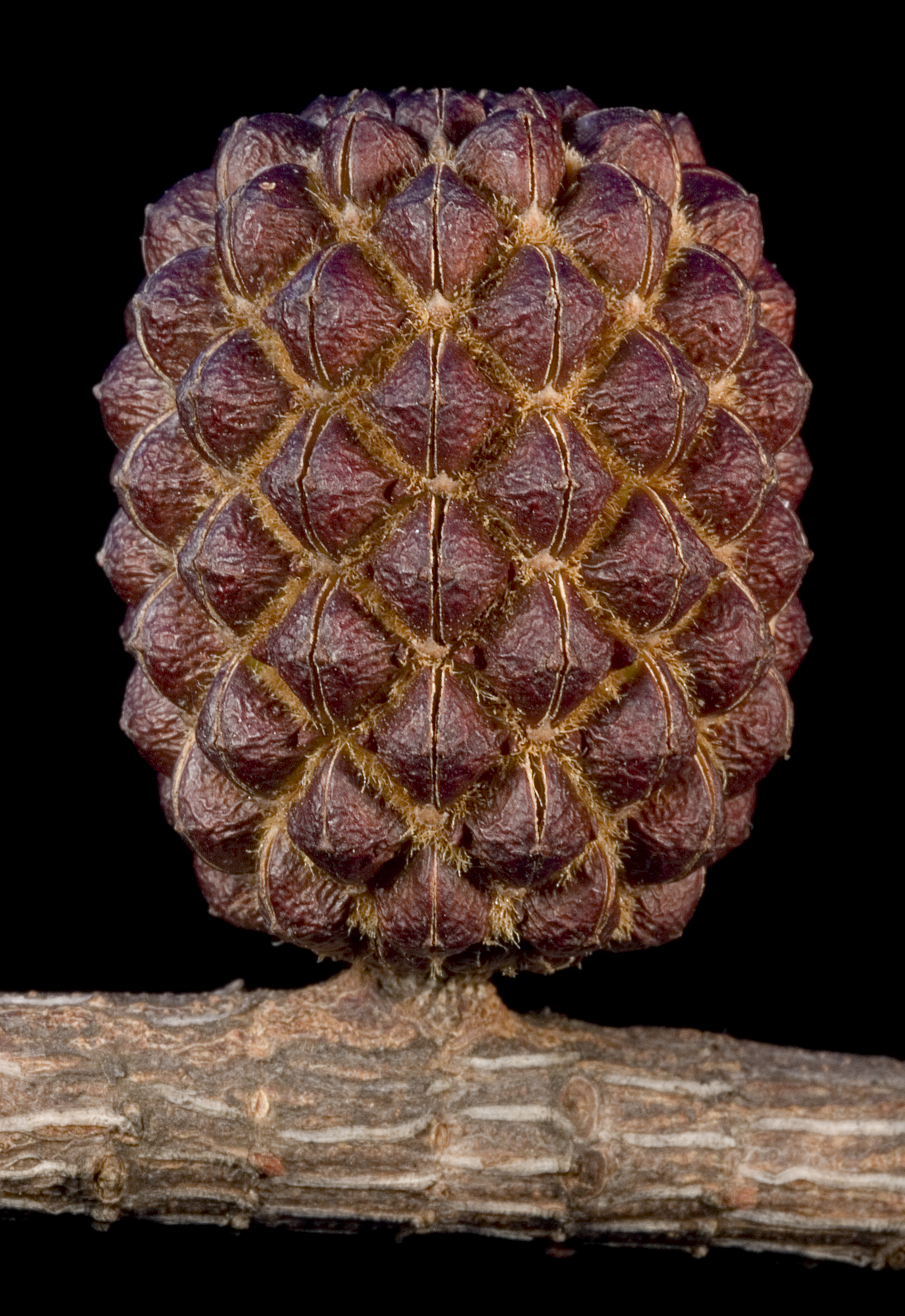
- A. huegeliana: Fruit

Conservation status
- Least Concern (IUCN 3.1)

Scientific classification
- Kingdom: Plantae
- Clade: Tracheophytes
- Clade: Angiosperms
- Clade: Eudicots
- Clade: Rosids
- Order: Fagales
- Family: Casuarinaceae
- Genus: Allocasuarina
- Species: A. huegeliana

Binomial name
- Allocasuarina huegeliana (Miq.) L.A.S.Johnson
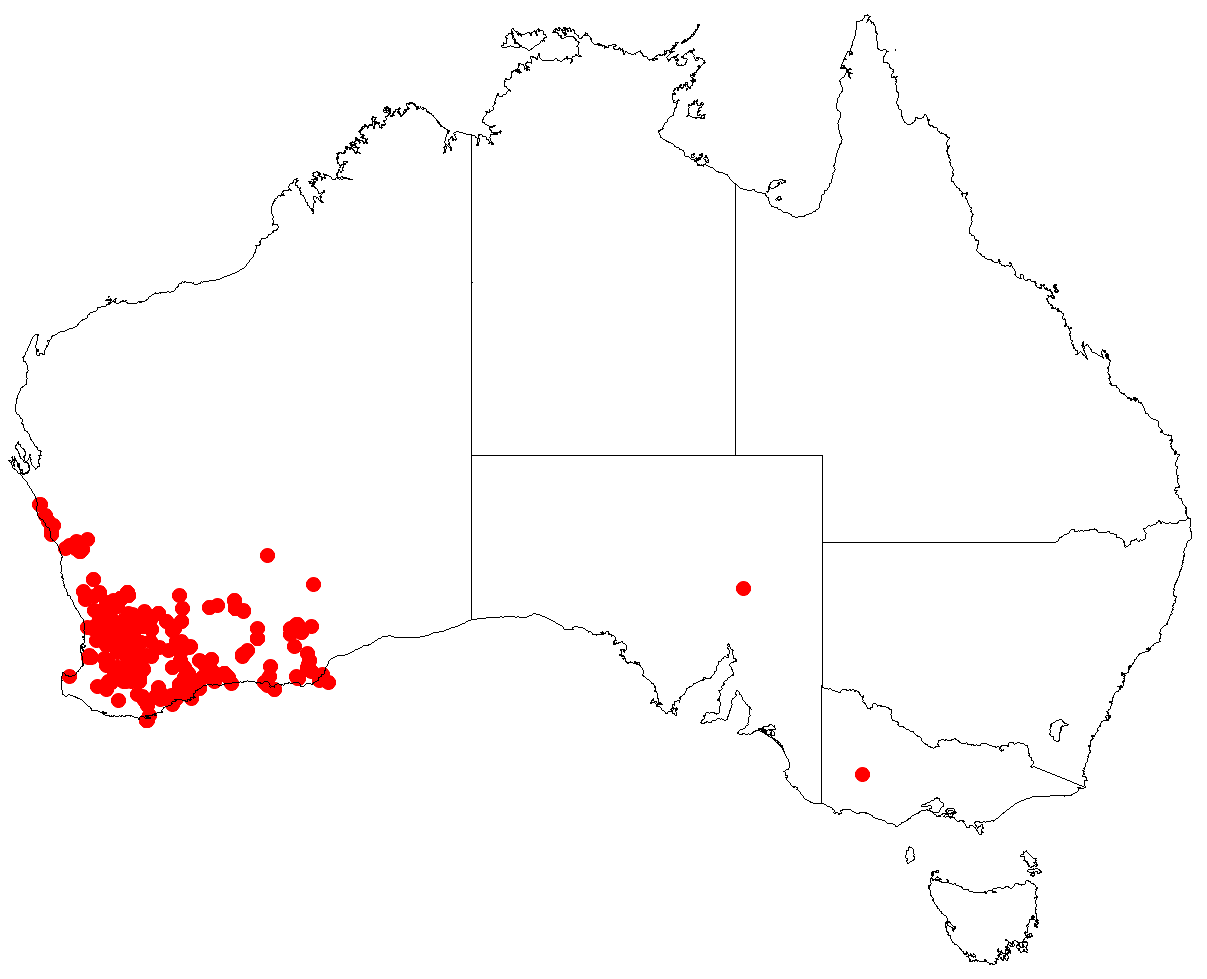
- Occurrence data from AVH

Synonyms
- Casuarina dorrienii Domin; Casuarina huegeliana Miq.

= Allocasuarina huegeliana =

Species of flowering plant

Allocasuarina huegeliana, commonly known as rock sheoak is a species of flowering plant in the family Casuarinaceae and is endemic to Western Australia. It is a dioecious tree that has its leaves reduced to scales in whorls of eight to ten, the mature fruiting cones 14–35 mm (0.55–1.38 in) long containing winged seeds (samaras) 5–7 mm (0.20–0.28 in) long.

== Description ==
Allocasuarina huegeliana is a dioecious tree that typically grows to a height of 4–10 m (13–33 ft) and has dark, fissured bark. Its needle-like branchlets are up to 400 mm (16 in) long, the leaves reduced to scale-like teeth 0.5–0.7 mm (0.020–0.028 in) long, arranged in whorls of eight to ten around the branchlets. The sections of branchlet between the leaf whorls (the "articles") are mostly 8–13 mm (0.31–0.51 in) long and 0.8–0.9 mm (0.031–0.035 in) wide. Male flowers are arranged in spikes 20–100 mm (0.79–3.94 in) long, in whorls of 4.5 to seven per centimetre (per 0.39 in.), the anthers 0.8–1.2 mm (0.031–0.047 in) long. Female cones are borne on a peduncle 3–5 mm (0.12–0.20 in) long. Flowering occurs from May to December or January, and the mature cones are 14–35 mm (0.55–1.38 in) long and 10–14 mm (0.39–0.55 in) in diameter containing dark brown to black samaras 5–7 mm (0.20–0.28 in) long. This species is similar to A. verticillata.

== Taxonomy ==
This species was first formally described in 1848 by Friedrich Anton Wilhelm Miquel who gave it the name Casuarina huegeliana in Lehmann's Plantae Preissianae, from specimens collected on Mount Brown near York in 1840 by Ludwig Preiss. It was reclassified in 1982 as Allocasuarina drummondiana by Lawrie Johnson in the Journal of the Adelaide Botanic Gardens. The specific epithet (huegeliana) honours the collector of the type specimens.

== Distribution and habitat ==
Rock sheoak grows near granite in the south-west of Western Australia, where it in native in parts of its range, but naturalised in other places. It occurs from the Murchison River and Mingenew, south to the south coast, and east to near Balladonia, in the Avon Wheatbelt, Coolgardie, Esperance Plains, Geraldton Sandplains, Jarrah Forest, Mallee, Murchison and Swan Coastal Plain bioregions of Western Australia.

== Conservation status ==
Allocasuarina huegeliana is listed as "not threatened" by the Government of Western Australia Department of Biodiversity, Conservation and Attractions.

== Use in horticulture ==
A. huegeliana is a moderate to fast growing tree that is nitrogen fixing. It can be grown as a windbreak. The species thrives in well-drained soils but will do poorly in saline or poorly drained areas. The attractive and dense wood from the tree is used to make specialty furniture while the foliage is used by grazing stock as fodder. The species is drought and frost tolerant but will be killed by fire. Trees can live up an age of over 15 years.
