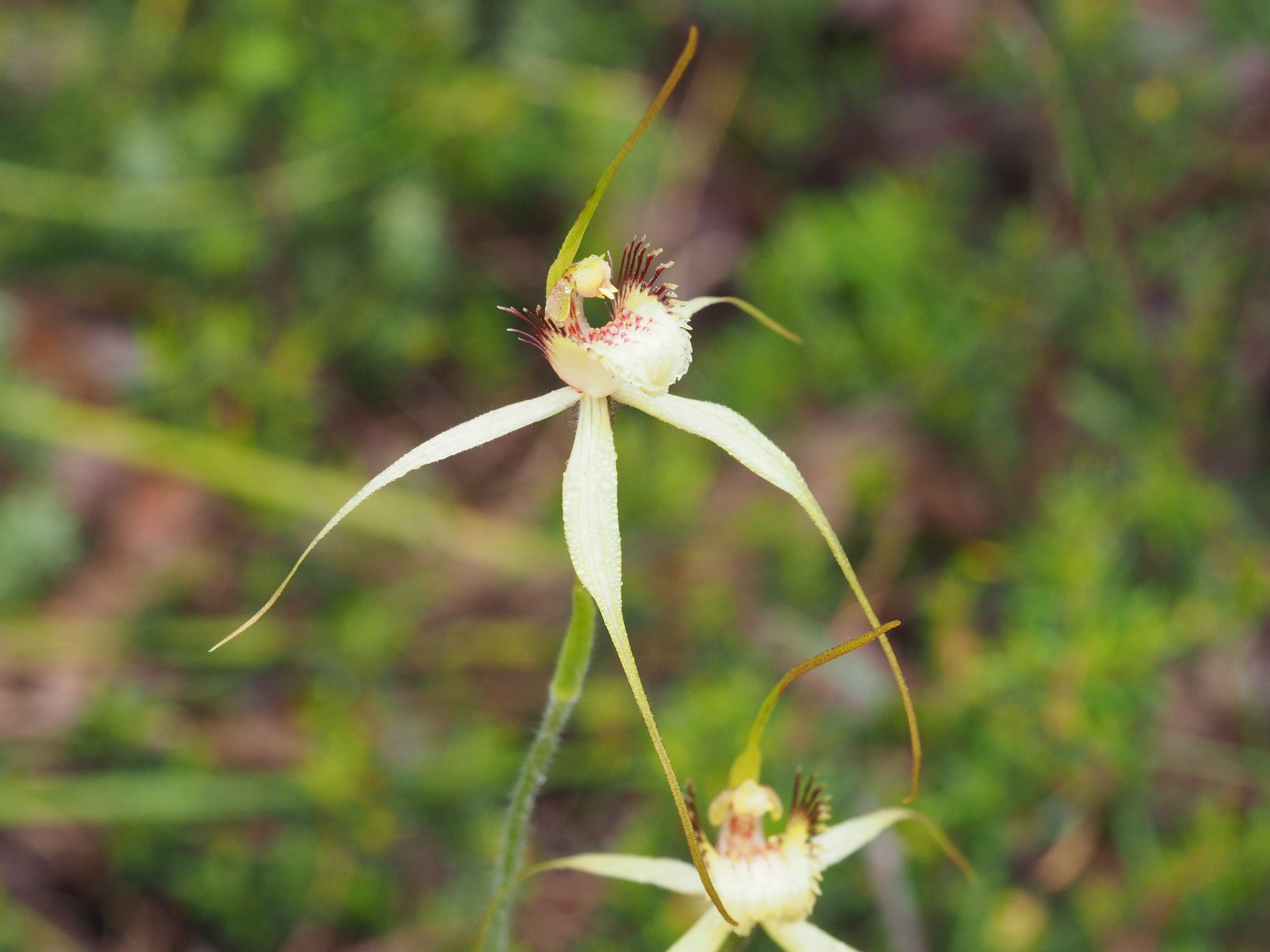
- Near Dunsborough

Conservation status
- Endangered (EPBC Act)

Scientific classification
- Kingdom: Plantae
- Clade: Embryophytes
- Clade: Tracheophytes
- Clade: Spermatophytes
- Clade: Angiosperms
- Clade: Monocots
- Order: Asparagales
- Family: Orchidaceae
- Subfamily: Orchidoideae
- Tribe: Diurideae
- Genus: Caladenia
- Species: C. busselliana

Binomial name
- Caladenia busselliana Hopper & A.P.Br.

Synonyms
- Arachnorchis busselliana (Hopper & A.P.Br.) D.L.Jones & M.A.Clem.; Caladenia busselliana N.Hoffman & A.P.Br. nom. inval.; Caladenia busselliana Paczk. & A.R.Chapm. nom. inval.; Calonemorchis busselliana (Hopper & A.P.Br.) Szlach. & Rutk. nom. superfl.

= Caladenia busselliana =

Bussell's spider orchid

Species of orchid

Caladenia busselliana, commonly known as Bussell's spider orchid, is a plant in the orchid family Orchidaceae and is endemic to a small area in the south-west of Western Australia. It is a rare orchid with an erect, hairy leaf and up to three pale yellow flowers.

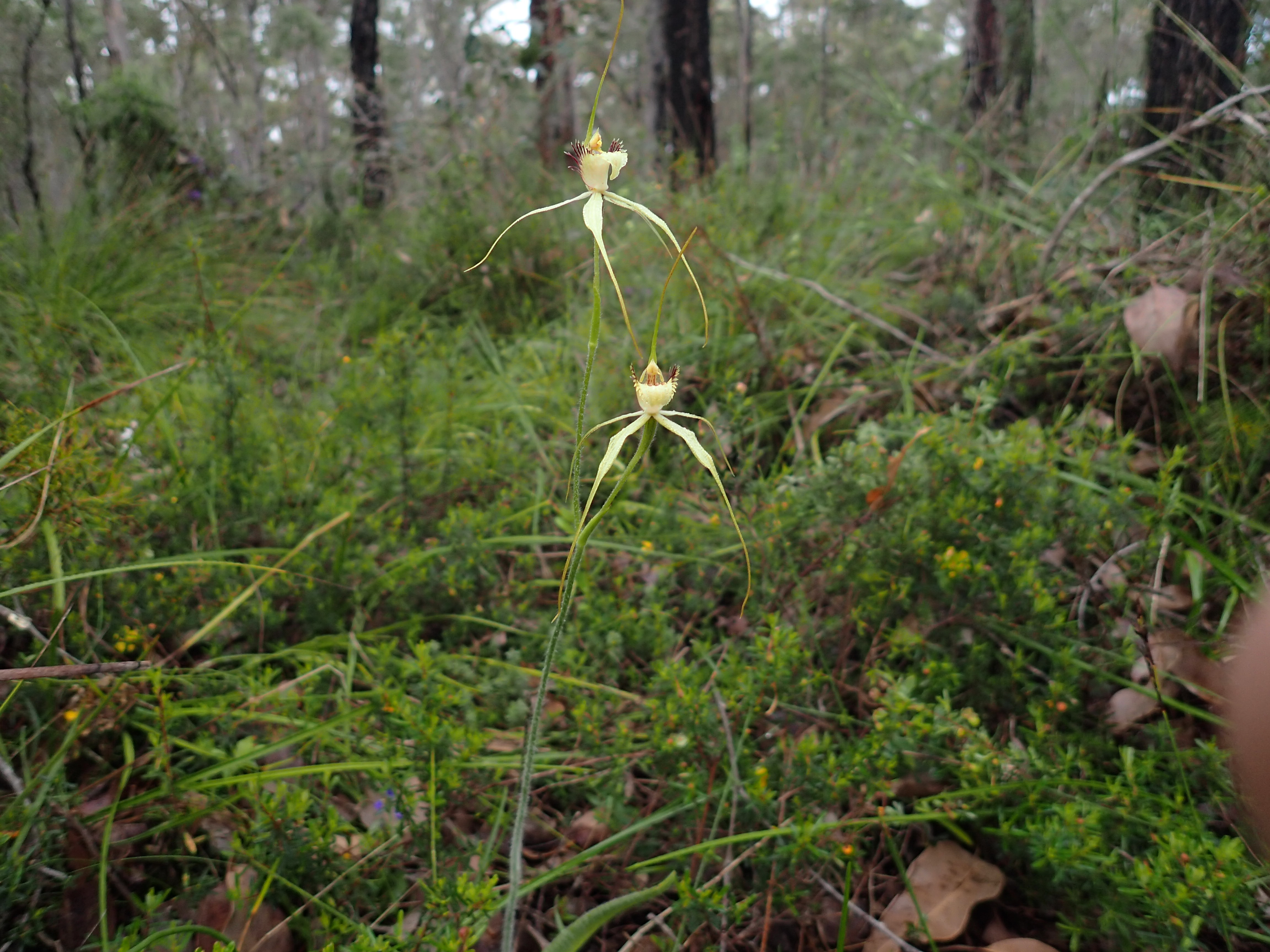
Habit

== Description ==
Caladenia busselliana is a terrestrial, perennial, deciduous, herb with an underground tuber and a single erect, hairy leaf 20–30 cm (8–10 in) long and 5–10 mm (0.2–0.4 in) wide. There are up to three pale yellow flowers on a stem 20–30 cm (8–10 in) high. The flowers are 6–10 cm (2–4 in) long and 5–8 cm (2–3 in) wide. The lateral sepals and petals spread widely and the sepals are thickened. The labellum is pale yellow to white and lacks the red tip common to similar spider orchids. The sides of the labellum have narrow teeth or calli which have a "clubbed" end. There are four or more rows of red-tipped calli along the centre of the labellum. Flowering occurs between September and October and is followed by a non-fleshy, dehiscent capsule containing a large number of seeds.

== Taxonomy and naming ==
Caladenia busselliana was first formally described by Stephen Hopper and Andrew Brown in 2001 from a specimen collected by Greg Bussell near Quindalup and the description was published in Nuytsia. The specific epithet (busselliana) honours the collector of the type specimen.

== Distribution and habitat ==
Bussell's spider orchid grows in swampy jarrah forest and marri woodland, often with green kangaroo paw, (Anigozanthos viridis) and the more common swamp spider orchid (Caladenia paludosa). It is only known from two small areas near Vasse and Yallingup at the northern end of the Leeuwin-Naturaliste ridge in the Swan Coastal Plain biogeographic region.

== Conservation ==
Caladenia busselliana is classified as "endangered" under the Australian Government Environment Protection and Biodiversity Conservation Act 1999 (EPBC Act) and as "rare flora" under the Western Australian Wildlife Conservation Act 1950. Only about fifty specimens are known and there is a continuing decline in the quality of habitat and number of mature individuals.
