= Acca (plant) =

Scientific classification
- Kingdom: Plantae
- Clade: Embryophytes
- Clade: Tracheophytes
- Clade: Spermatophytes
- Clade: Angiosperms
- Clade: Eudicots
- Clade: Rosids
- Order: Myrtales
- Family: Myrtaceae
- Tribe: Myrteae
- Genus: Acca; O.Berg

Synonyms
- Orthostemon O.Berg

Genus of flowering plants in the myrtle family

Acca is a genus of shrubs and small trees in the family Myrtaceae that is native to Bolivia and Peru. The scientific name of the genus is from a native Peruvian name for A. macrostema.

Acca was first described as a genus in 1856. The genus comprises two species.

- Acca lanuginosa (Ruiz & Pav. ex G.Don) McVaugh – central + southern Peru
- Acca macrostema (Ruiz & Pav. ex G.Don) McVaugh – Bolivia, central + southern Peru

A third species formerly often included in the genus, Acca sellowiana (O.Berg) Burret, is now treated in its own separate genus, Feijoa. This followed genetic research which showed that the type species of Acca (A. lanuginosa) is more closely related to the genus Myrrhinium than it is to "A. sellowiana", thus leaving Acca polyphyletic with respect to Myrrhinium if "A. sellowiana" is included.

- Feijoa sellowiana (O.Berg) O.Berg
