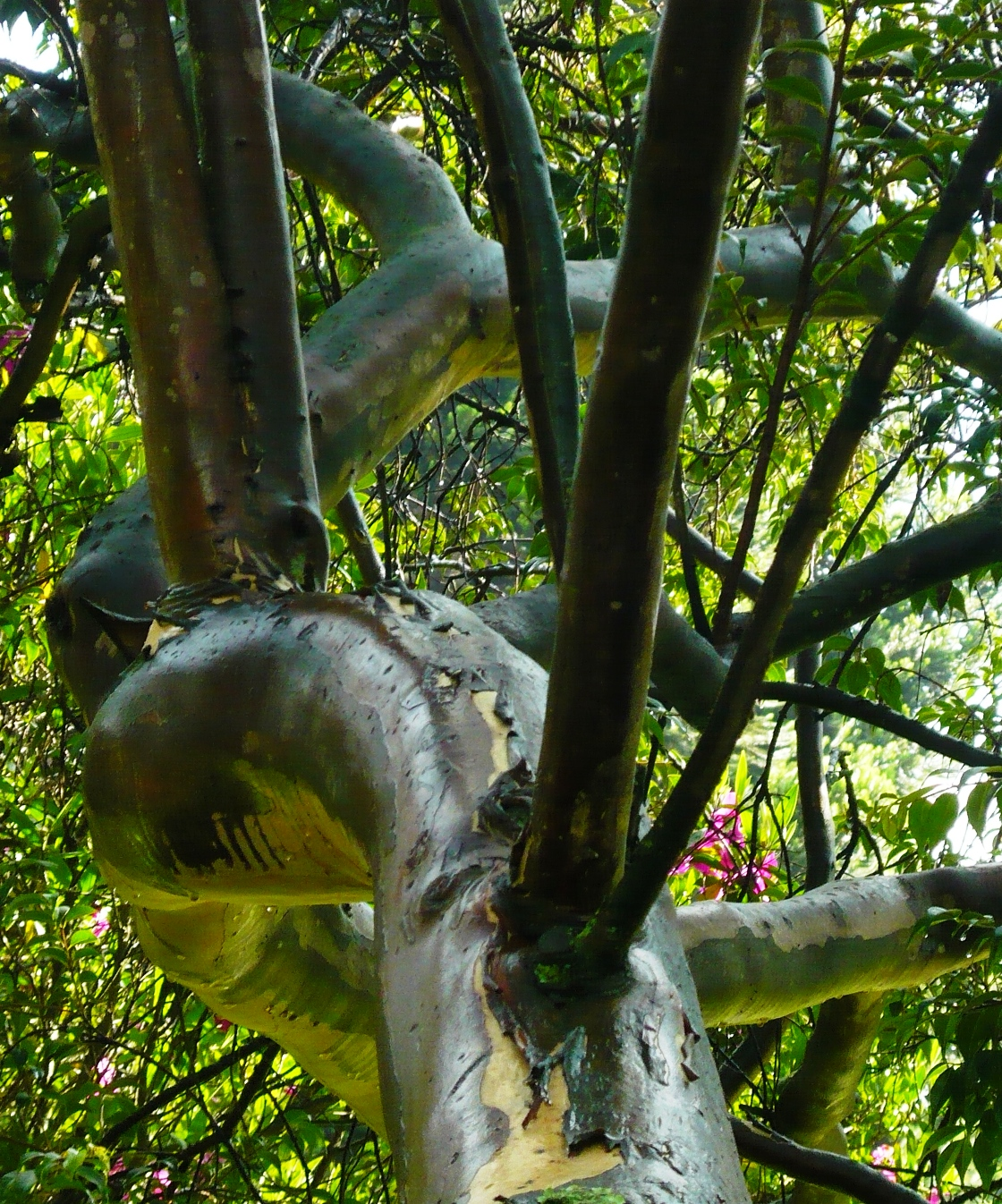
- Calycolpus moritzianus

Scientific classification
- Kingdom: Plantae
- Clade: Embryophytes
- Clade: Tracheophytes
- Clade: Spermatophytes
- Clade: Angiosperms
- Clade: Eudicots
- Clade: Rosids
- Order: Myrtales
- Family: Myrtaceae
- Subfamily: Myrtoideae
- Tribe: Myrteae
- Genus: Calycolpus; O.Berg

Synonyms
- Psidiopsis O.Berg

= Calycolpus =

Genus of flowering plants in the myrtle family

Calycolpus is a genus of the botanical family Myrtaceae, first described as a genus in 1856. It is native to the South America, Central America, and the West Indies.

The species formerly called Calycolpus excisus is a small tree known only from the limestone mountains of eastern Cuba, now known as Eugenia excisa. It is on the IUCN Red List of Threatened species.

Species

1. Calycolpus aequatorialis Landrum – Sucumbíos
2. Calycolpus alternifolius (Gleason) Landrum – S Venezuela
3. Calycolpus andersonii Landrum – Pará
4. Calycolpus australis Landrum – Minas Gerais
5. Calycolpus bolivarensis Landrum – Bolívar State
6. Calycolpus calophyllus (Kunth) O.Berg – Guyana, Venezuela, Colombia, Peru, N Brazil
7. Calycolpus cochleatus McVaugh – Bolívar State, Guyana
8. Calycolpus goetheanus (Mart. ex DC.) O.Berg – Trinidad, N South America
9. Calycolpus legrandii Mattos – Alagoas, Bahia
10. Calycolpus moritzianus (O.Berg) Burret – Venezuela, Colombia, Ecuador
11. Calycolpus revolutus (Schauer) O.Berg – Guyana, Suriname, Fr Guiana
12. Calycolpus roraimensis Steyerm. – Venezuela, Guyana, Rondônia, Peru
13. Calycolpus sessiliflorus Landrum – Bahia
14. Calycolpus surinamensis McVaugh – Guyana, Suriname, Pará
15. Calycolpus warscewiczianus O.Berg – Costa Rica, Panama, Nicaragua
