= Calycolpus warscewiczianus =

Scientific classification
- Kingdom: Plantae
- Clade: Tracheophytes
- Clade: Angiosperms
- Clade: Eudicots
- Clade: Rosids
- Order: Myrtales
- Family: Myrtaceae
- Genus: Calycolpus
- Species: C. warscewiczianus

Binomial name
- Calycolpus warscewiczianus O.Berg

Species of flowering plant

Calycolpus warscewiczianus is a plant species native to Nicaragua, Costa Rica, Panama and Venezuela.

Calycolpus warscewiczianus is a tree up to 7 m high, with exfoliating bark. Leaves are opposite, ovate to oblong, up to 8 cm long, thick and leathery, hairless, three times as long as wide, tapering at the tips. Flowers are whitish to pink, fragrant. Berries are almost spherical, about 1 cm in diameter. The species is related to C. goetheanus but with thicker leaves that have more of a tendency to taper at the tip.

The species is named in honor of Polish botanist Josef Ritter von Rawiez Warscewiecz, 1812–1866. He is best known for his work on orchids of Central America, although he did contribute to the knowledge of other plant families as well. The type locale of Calycolpus warscewiczianus is given simply as "America australi," i.e. "southern America" but the collection is attributed to Warscewiecz. Presumably, the specimen was likely collected in Central America, as this is where Warscewiecz did most of his field work.
