= Accara =

Scientific classification
- Kingdom: Plantae
- Clade: Embryophytes
- Clade: Tracheophytes
- Clade: Spermatophytes
- Clade: Angiosperms
- Clade: Eudicots
- Clade: Rosids
- Order: Myrtales
- Family: Myrtaceae
- Subfamily: Myrtoideae
- Tribe: Myrteae
- Genus: Accara; L.R.Landrum
- Species: A. elegans

Binomial name
- Accara elegans (DC.) L.R.Landrum

Synonyms
- Myrtus elegans DC.; Psidium elegans (DC.) Mart. ex O.Berg 1857 not Miq. 1855; Guajava elegans (DC.) Kuntze; Myrtus stictophylla Kiaersk.; Psidium stictophyllum (Kiaersk.) Mattos

Genus of plants in the myrtle family

Accara elegans is the sole species of the monotypic genus Accara in the botanical family Myrtaceae. It is a shrub endemic to the State of Minas Gerais in Brazil, reaching 1–2 m (3.3–6.6 ft) in height.

Formerly included in the genera Myrtus and Psidium, Accara differs from the latter in embryo structure, and from the former in being pentamerous (having its parts in fives) and in bud structure. The generic name is an anagram of the type location, Caraça, and is similar to the presumably closely related genus of Acca, nowadays sometimes included in Feijoa.
