= Myrteola nummularia =

Conservation status
- Least Concern (IUCN 3.1)

Scientific classification
- Kingdom: Plantae
- Clade: Tracheophytes
- Clade: Angiosperms
- Clade: Eudicots
- Clade: Rosids
- Order: Myrtales
- Family: Myrtaceae
- Genus: Myrteola
- Species: M. nummularia

Binomial name
- Myrteola nummularia (Poir.) O.Berg

Synonyms
- Synonymy: Cluacena vaccinioides (Kunth) Raf.; Eugenia humifusa Phil.; Eugenia leucomyrtillus (Griseb.) Phil.; Myrteola barneoudii (O.Berg) O.Berg; Myrteola barneoudii var. humifusa (Phil.) Reiche; Myrteola bullata O.Berg; Myrteola bullata var. pentamera O.Berg; Myrteola bullata var. tetramera O.Berg; Myrteola humifusa (Phil.) O.Berg; Myrteola leucomyrtillus (Griseb.) Reiche; Myrteola nannophylla Burret; Myrteola nummularia var. barneoudii (O.Berg) Kausel; Myrteola nummularia var. repens (Phil.) Reiche; Myrteola oxycoccoides (Benth.) O.Berg; Myrteola philippii O.Berg; Myrteola repens (Phil.) O.Berg; Myrteola vaccinioides (Kunth) O.Berg; Myrteola vaccinioides var. carabaya McVaugh; Myrtus barneoudii O.Berg; Myrtus leucomyrtillus Griseb.; Myrtus leucomyrtus Griseb. ex Phil.; Myrtus nummularia Poir.; Myrtus nummularia Barnéoud, nom. illeg. homonym. post.; Myrtus nummularia var. major Hook.f.; Myrtus oxycoccoides Benth.; Myrtus repens Phil.; Myrtus vaccinioides Kunth; Orestion vaccinioides Kunze ex O.Berg

Species of plant

Myrteola nummularia (also known as teaberry, huarapo, ñaurapo or daudapo) is a species of flowering plant in the family Myrtaceae. It is a subshrub or shrub native to the Andes of Colombia, Venezuela, Ecuador, Peru, and Bolivia, to southern Chile and southern Argentina including Patagonia, and to the Falkland Islands. It is a small perennial shrub often wider than it is tall, which grows in marshy areas. It has edible berries which may be eaten fresh or used in the preparation of jams or liquors.

== See also ==
- Ugni molinae
- Myrcianthes coquimbensis
