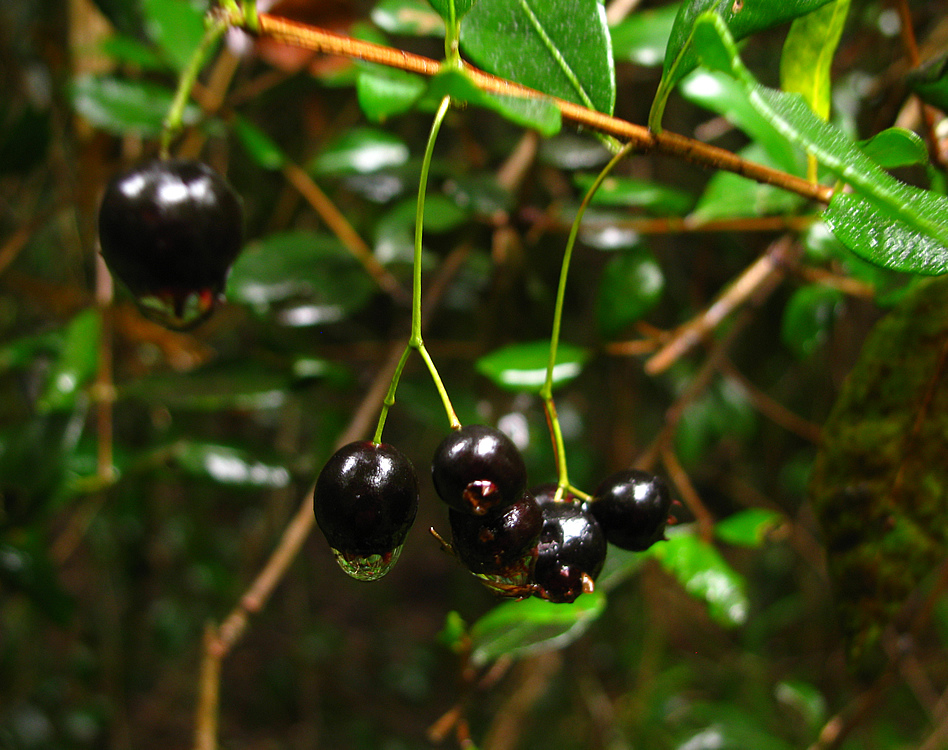

Conservation status
- Near Threatened (IUCN 3.1)

Scientific classification
- Kingdom: Plantae
- Clade: Tracheophytes
- Clade: Angiosperms
- Clade: Eudicots
- Clade: Rosids
- Order: Myrtales
- Family: Myrtaceae
- Genus: Temu; O.Berg (1861)
- Species: T. cruckshanksii

Binomial name
- Temu cruckshanksii (Hook. & Arn.) O.Berg (1861)

Synonyms
- Synonymy: Blepharocalyx cruckshanksii (Hook. & Arn.) Nied. (1893); Blepharocalyx divaricatus (O.Berg) Nied. (1893); Blepharocalyx divaricatus var. obovatus (O.Berg) Reiche (1897); Blepharocalyx divaricatus var. ovalis (O.Berg) Reiche (1897); Blepharocalyx divaricatus var. pauciflorus (O.Berg) Reiche (1897); Eugenia cruckshanksii Hook. & Arn. (1833); Eugenia divaricata O.Berg (1856), nom. illeg.; Eugenia divaricata var. obovata O.Berg (1856); Eugenia divaricata var. ovalis O.Berg in Linnaea 27: 258 (1856); Eugenia divaricata var. pauciflora O.Berg (1856); Eugenia elliptica Phil. (1865), nom. illeg.; Luma cruckshanksii (Hook. & Arn.) A.Gray (1853); Myrtus cruckshanksii (Hook. & Arn.) Kuntze (1898); Temu divaricatum O.Berg (1861)

= Temu cruckshanksii =

Species of flowering plant

Temu cruckshanksii (Mapudungun: temu) is a species of flowering plant in the family Myrtaceae. It is endemic to central and southern Chile. It is threatened by habitat loss.

== Taxonomy ==
The species was described as Temu cruckshanksii by Otto Karl Berg in 1861, but was later placed in the genus Blepharocalyx. After phylogenetic analyses of the tribe Mytreae found Blepharocalyx to be polyphyletic, the species was returned to the genus Temu in 2019.

== Description ==
The plant grows to be 15 meters with a trunk diameter of approximately 50 centimeters. The bark is smooth and reddish brown. Leaves are oval-shaped, while the flowers are white and arranged in inflorescences. Fruits are round, dark brown with hints of reddish tone, and taste bitter.

The toponym of Temuco, a city in southern Chile, derives from this species, meaning in the Mapuche language "Temu water" or "temu in the water" ("co" means water in the Mapuche language).

== Range and habitat ==
Temu cruckshanksii is endemic to central and southern Chile, ranging from Aconcagua in Valparaíso Region in the north to Llanquihue in Los Lagos Region in the south.

It grows in temperate forests, and in relict coastal forests in the mediterranean-climate north. It grows in humid and shady places or on the banks of watercourses in both the Chilean Coast Range and the foothills of the Andes from 400 to 1,000 meters of elevation. It does not tolerate regular snow, but can withstand occasional short-duration frosts to approximately -5 °C.
