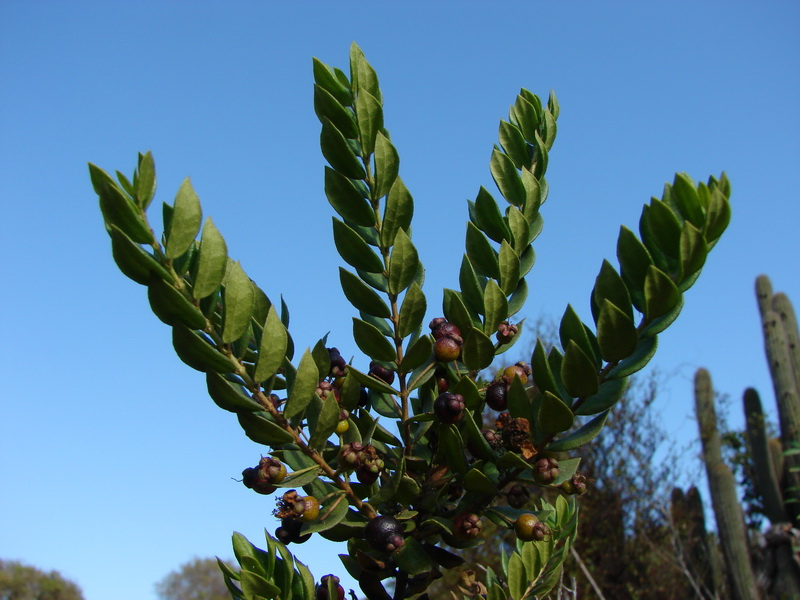

Conservation status
- Least Concern (IUCN 3.1)

Scientific classification
- Kingdom: Plantae
- Clade: Tracheophytes
- Clade: Angiosperms
- Clade: Eudicots
- Clade: Rosids
- Order: Myrtales
- Family: Myrtaceae
- Genus: Luma
- Species: L. chequen

Binomial name
- Luma chequen (Molina) A.Gray

Synonyms
- List: Eugenia bella Phil., nom. illeg. homonym. post.; Eugenia chekan DC., orth. var.; Eugenia cheken Lam.; Eugenia chequen Molina; Eugenia gayana Barnéoud; Eugenia myrtomimeta Diels; Eugenia pulchra O.Berg; Luma gayana (Barnéoud) Burret; Myrceugenella chequen (Molina) Kausel; Myrceugenella chequen var. myrtomimeta (Diels) Kausel; Myrceugenella gayana (Barnéoud) Kausel; Myrceugenella langerfeldtii Kausel; Myrtus chequen (Molina) Spreng.; Myrtus gayana (Barnéoud) O.Berg; Myrtus gayana var. major O.Berg; Myrtus luma Schauer nom. illeg.; Myrtus uliginosa Miq.; Myrtus uliginosa f. major Miq.

= Luma chequen =

Species of flowering plant

Luma chequen, the white Chilean myrtle, is a species of flowering plant in the genus Luma in the family Myrtaceae, native to the southern Andes mountains in central and southern Chile, at latitudes located 30 to 41° South. Synonyms include Eugenia chequen Molina, Myrtus chequen (Molina) Spreng., and Luma gayana (Barn.) Burret. Common names in Spanish include chequén, huillipeta, and arrayán blanco (white myrtle).

It is a shrub (rarely a small tree) growing to 9 m tall, with dull grey-brown bark (unlike the smooth red bark of the related Luma apiculata). It is evergreen, with small fragrant oval leaves 0.5-2.5 cm long and 0.3-1.5 cm broad, and white flowers in early to mid summer. Its fruit is an edible dark purple berry 1 cm in diameter, ripe in early autumn.

It has been introduced as ornamental in the North Pacific Coast of the United States.

== Etymology ==
Luma is a derivation of a vernacular Chilean name for this species.
