= Amomyrtella irregularis =

Conservation status
- Endangered (IUCN 3.1)

Scientific classification
- Kingdom: Plantae
- Clade: Tracheophytes
- Clade: Angiosperms
- Clade: Eudicots
- Clade: Rosids
- Order: Myrtales
- Family: Myrtaceae
- Genus: Amomyrtella
- Species: A. irregularis

Binomial name
- Amomyrtella irregularis (McVaugh) Landrum & Morocho

Synonyms
- Myrcianthes irregularis McVaugh

Species of flowering plant

Amomyrtella irregularis (formerly Myrcianthes irregularis) is a species of tree in the myrtle family, Myrtaceae. It is endemic to Ecuador, where it grows in the humid forests of the Andes. Its common name is mate-mate.
