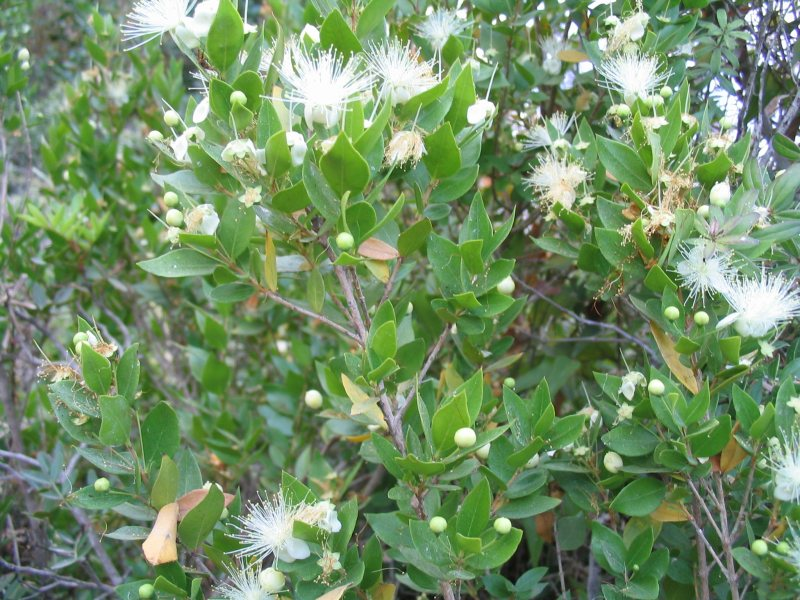
- Myrtus communis

Scientific classification
- Kingdom: Plantae
- Clade: Tracheophytes
- Clade: Angiosperms
- Clade: Eudicots
- Clade: Rosids
- Order: Myrtales
- Family: Myrtaceae
- Subfamily: Myrtoideae
- Tribe: Myrteae; DC.

= Myrteae =

Tribe of flowering plants in the myrtle family

Myrteae is the largest tribe in the plant family Myrtaceae. It includes most of the species of the family that have fleshy fruits.

Well-known members include edible fruit such as feijoa (Feijoa sellowiana), guava (Psidium guajava), strawberry guava (Psidium cattleyanum), jabuticaba (Plinia cauliflora), Surinam cherry (Eugenia uniflora), arazá (Eugenia stipitata), camu camu (Myrciaria dubia), and rumberry (Myrciaria floribunda). The tribe also includes many plants grown primarily for their ornamental value, including common myrtle (Myrtus communis), temu (Luma apiculata), ugniberry (Ugni molinae), and rose myrtle (Rhodomyrtus tomentosa) and some common spices such as allspice (Pimenta dioica).

== Genera ==
- Acca O.Berg
- Accara Landrum
- Algrizea Proença & NicLugh.
- Amomyrtella Kausel
- Amomyrtus (Burret) D.Legrand & Kausel
- Archirhodomyrtus (Nied.) Burret
- Austromyrtus (Nied.) Burret
- Blepharocalyx O.Berg
- Calycolpus O.Berg
- Calycorectes O.Berg
- Calyptranthes Sw.
- Calyptrogenia Burret
- Campomanesia Ruiz & Pav.
- Chamguava Landrum
- Curitiba Salywon & Landrum
- Decaspermum J.R.Forst. & G.Forst.
- Eugenia L.
- Feijoa O.Berg
- Gomidesia O.Berg
- Gossia N.Snow et al.
- Hexachlamys O.Berg
- Hottea Urb.
- Kanakomyrtus N.Snow
- Legrandia Kausel
- Lenwebbia N.Snow et al.
- Lithomyrtus F.Muell.
- Lophomyrtus Burret
- Luma A.Gray
- Marlierea Cambess.
- Meteoromyrtus Gamble
- Mitranthes O.Berg
- Mosiera Small
- Myrceugenia O.Berg
- †Myrceugenelloxylon
- Myrcia DC. ex Guill.
- Myrcianthes O.Berg
- Myrciaria O.Berg
- Myrrhinium Schott
- Myrtastrum Burret
- Myrtella F.Muell.
- Myrteola O.Berg
- Myrtus L.
- Neomitranthes D.Legrand
- Neomyrtus Burret
- Octamyrtus Diels
- Pilidiostigma Burret
- Pimenta Lindl.
- Plinia L.
- Pseudanamomis Kausel
- Psidium L.
- Rhodamnia Jack
- Rhodomyrtus (DC.) Rchb.
- Siphoneugena O.Berg
- Stereocaryum Burret
- Ugni Turcz.
- Uromyrtus Burret
