= Chamguava =

Scientific classification
- Kingdom: Plantae
- Clade: Tracheophytes
- Clade: Angiosperms
- Clade: Eudicots
- Clade: Rosids
- Order: Myrtales
- Family: Myrtaceae
- Subfamily: Myrtoideae
- Tribe: Myrteae
- Genus: Chamguava; L.R.Landrum

Genus of flowering plants in the myrtle family

Chamguava is a genus of the botanical family Myrtaceae, first described as a genus in 1991. It is native to southern Mexico and Central America.

Species

1. Chamguava gentlei (Lundell) Landrum - Chiapas, Belize, Guatemala, Honduras
2. Chamguava musarum (Standl. & Steyerm.) Landrum - Guatemala
3. Chamguava schippii (Standl.) Landrum - Guerrero, Chiapas, Belize, Guatemala, Panama
