= Myrteola =

Scientific classification
- Kingdom: Plantae
- Clade: Tracheophytes
- Clade: Angiosperms
- Clade: Eudicots
- Clade: Rosids
- Order: Myrtales
- Family: Myrtaceae
- Subfamily: Myrtoideae
- Tribe: Myrteae
- Genus: Myrteola; O. Berg

Synonyms
- Amyrsia Raf.; Cluacena Raf.; Orestion Kunze ex O.Berg

Genus of flowering plants in the myrtle family

Myrteola is a plant genus in the Myrtaceae described as a genus in 1856. It is native to South America and the Falkland Islands.

These plants are shrubs with leaves no more than 1 cm (0.4 in) long, with white flowers of 4 petals and fruits. In some high-altitude paramo areas, the plants are prostrate and form small lawns. Usually grow in rocky places.

Accepted species

1. Myrteola acerosa (O.Berg) Burret – Peru
2. Myrteola nummularia (Poir.) O.Berg – Falkland Islands, Chile, Argentina, Bolivia, Peru, Ecuador, Colombia, Venezuela
3. Myrteola phylicoides (Benth.) Landrum – Bolivia, Peru, Ecuador, Colombia
