= Curitiba prismatica =

Conservation status
- Vulnerable (IUCN 3.1)

Scientific classification
- Kingdom: Plantae
- Clade: Tracheophytes
- Clade: Angiosperms
- Clade: Eudicots
- Clade: Rosids
- Order: Myrtales
- Family: Myrtaceae
- Subfamily: Myrtoideae
- Tribe: Myrteae
- Genus: Curitiba; Salywon & Landrum
- Species: C. prismatica

Binomial name
- Curitiba prismatica (D.Legrand) Salywon & Landrum

Synonyms
- Eugenia prismatica D.Legrand; Mosiera prismatica (D.Legrand) Landrum

Species of flowering plant in the myrtle family

Curitiba prismatica is a species of tree in the family Myrtaceae. It is only species in the genus Curitiba, the species was originally described as Eugenia prismatica by D. Legrand in 1969 and moved to its own genus by Andrew M. Salywon and Leslie Roger Landrum in 2007. In Portuguese the species goes by the common names Cambuí, Guamirim, Mureira, and Murta. The species is listed as vulnerable by the ICUN.

Curitiba is a monotypic genus of plant in family Myrtaceae, endemic to Brazil. It can be found in the Araucaria rainforest of southern Brazil.
