= Calycolpus australis =

Scientific classification
- Kingdom: Plantae
- Clade: Tracheophytes
- Clade: Angiosperms
- Clade: Eudicots
- Clade: Rosids
- Order: Myrtales
- Family: Myrtaceae
- Genus: Calycolpus
- Species: C. australis

Binomial name
- Calycolpus australis L.R.Landrum

Species of flowering plant

Calycolpus australis is a plant species native to the State of Minas Gerais in Brazil. It can be found on poor, rocky soil that supports grasses but few shrubs or trees.

Calycolpus australis is a shrub up to 2 m high. Leaves are ovate to lanceolate, thick and leathery, up to 53 mm long. Flowers are about 3–4 cm across. Fruits are spherical, about 1 cm in diameter, purple and hairy.

The leaves of C. australis contain volatile oils.
