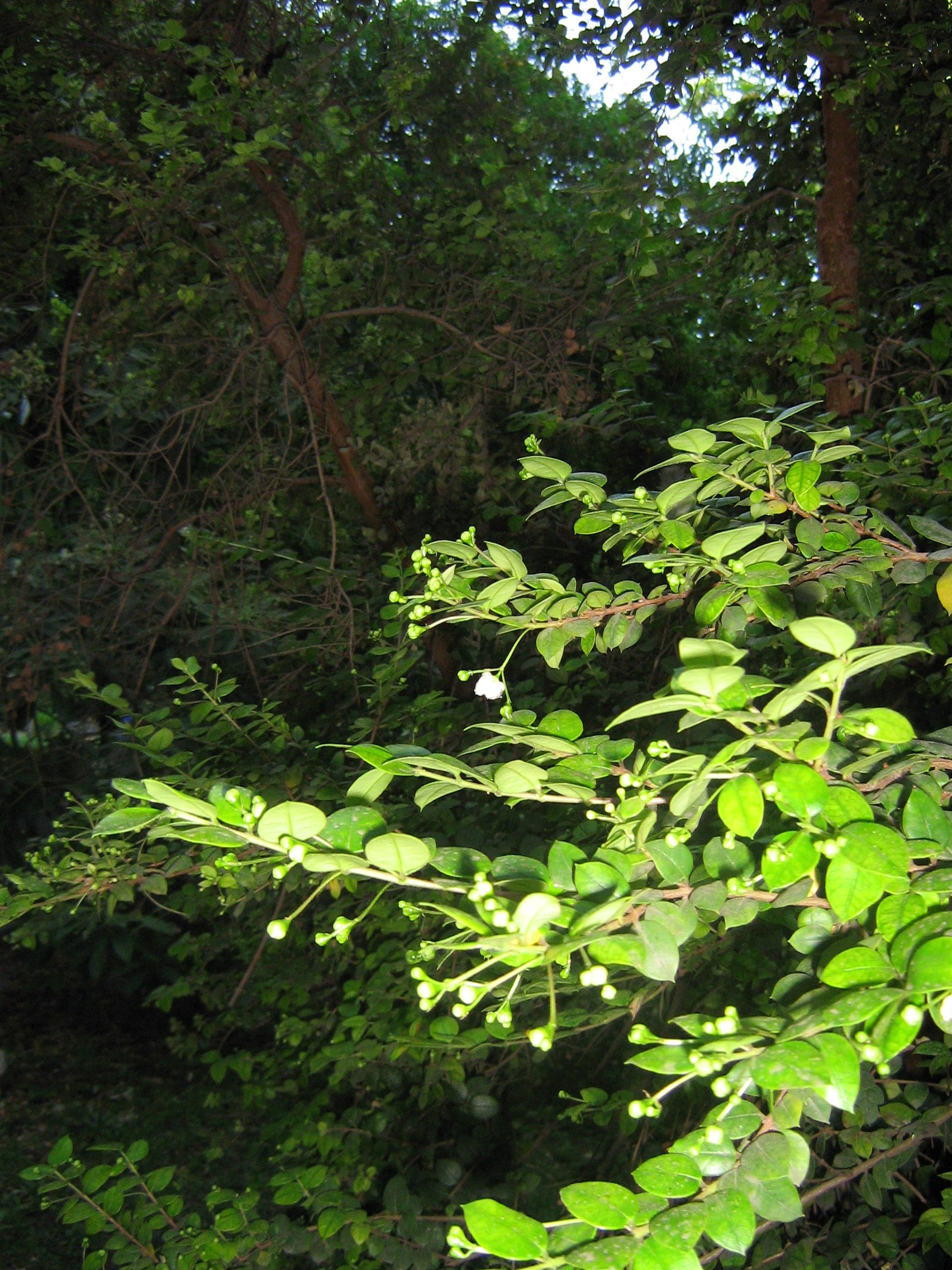

Scientific classification
- Kingdom: Plantae
- Clade: Tracheophytes
- Clade: Angiosperms
- Clade: Eudicots
- Clade: Rosids
- Order: Myrtales
- Family: Myrtaceae
- Subfamily: Myrtoideae
- Tribe: Myrteae
- Genus: Luma; A.Gray

Synonyms
- Myrceugenella Kausel

= Luma (plant) =

Genus of flowering plants in the myrtle family

Luma is a genus of flowering plants in the myrtle family Myrtaceae, described as a genus in 1853. It is native to the Valdivian temperate rain forests of Chile and Argentina.

They are shrubs or small trees with evergreen foliage and smooth red or orange bark, typically reaching 10–20 m (33–66 ft) tall and up to 1 m (3 ft) in trunk diameter. The leaves are opposite, oval, 1–5 cm (0.4–2.0 in) long and 0.5–3 cm (0.2–1.2 in) broad, entire, glossy dark green, with a spicy scent if crushed. The flowers are 2 cm (0.8 in) diameter with four white petals and numerous stamens; the fruit is a small purple or black berry 1 cm (0.4 in) diameter.

The genus name derives from the Mapuche (Native American) name for a related species, Amomyrtus luma. Though it grows slowly, luma wood is very dense and durable.

== Species ==
Image	Scientific name	Common name	Distribution
	Luma apiculata (DC.) Burret, Notizbl.	Chilean myrtle, known in Spanish as Arrayán or Temu	S Chile, S Argentina; naturalized in Alpine County in California
	Luma chequen (Molina) A.Gray	Chequén or Huillipeta	Central Chile; naturalized in Peru and Bolivia

formerly included

A long list of over 100 other names have been proposed in the genus, nearly all of them now regarded as members of other genera: Blepharocalyx, Eugenia, Myrceugenia, etc.
