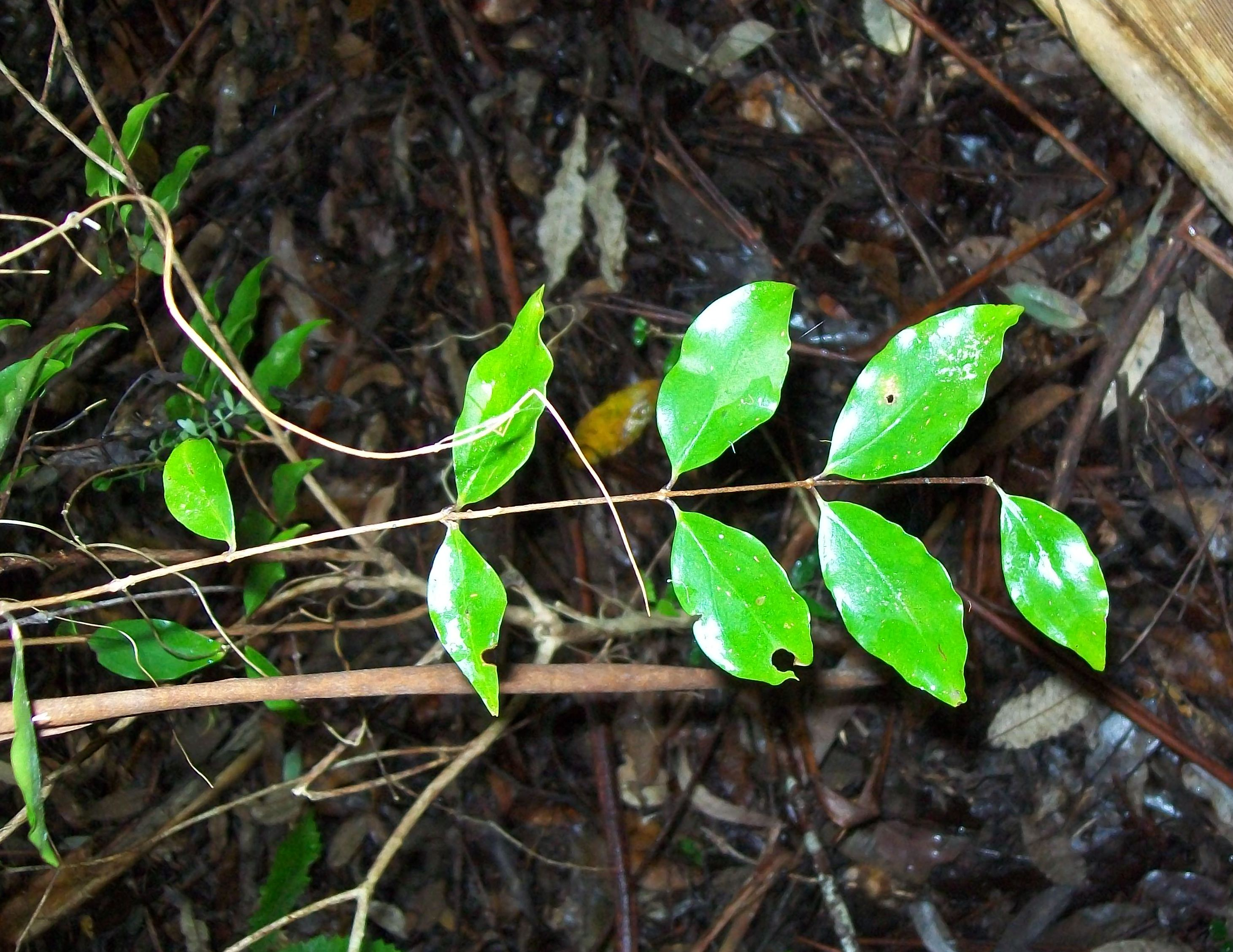
- Near Kendall, New South Wales

Conservation status
- Data Deficient (IUCN 3.1)

Scientific classification
- Kingdom: Plantae
- Clade: Tracheophytes
- Clade: Angiosperms
- Clade: Eudicots
- Clade: Rosids
- Order: Myrtales
- Family: Myrtaceae
- Genus: Archirhodomyrtus
- Species: A. beckleri

Binomial name
- Archirhodomyrtus beckleri (F.Muell.) A.J.Scott

Synonyms
- Myrtus beckleri F.Muell.; Myrtus cymiflora F.Muell.; Pilidiostigma cuneatum Burret; Pilidiostigma parviflorum Burret; Rhodomyrtus beckleri (F.Muell.) L.S.Sm.; Rhodomyrtus cymiflora (F.Muell.) Benth.

= Archirhodomyrtus beckleri =

Species of tree

Archirhodomyrtus beckleri, known as small-leaved myrtle or rose myrtle, is a shrub or small tree native to rainforest areas of New South Wales and Queensland in eastern Australia.

Rose myrtle leaves are 2–8 cm long and 1.5-2.5 cm wide, lanceolate, glossy and pleasantly fragrant when crushed. Flowers are 1 cm across, white, mauve or pink. The edible berry is 0.5-0.8 cm across, globular, yellow orange or red, containing numerous small seeds.

== Uses ==
The berry has a pleasant aromatic flavor reminiscent of Brazilian cherry. It can be eaten out-of-hand or used in sauces and preserves.
