= Acca lanuginosa =

Conservation status
- Endangered (IUCN 3.1)

Scientific classification
- Kingdom: Plantae
- Clade: Tracheophytes
- Clade: Angiosperms
- Clade: Eudicots
- Clade: Rosids
- Order: Myrtales
- Family: Myrtaceae
- Genus: Acca
- Species: A. lanuginosa

Binomial name
- Acca lanuginosa (Ruiz & Pavon ex G. Don) McVaugh

Synonyms
- Acca peruviana O.Berg; Acca velutina Burret; Psidium lanuginosum Ruiz & Pav. ex G.Don

Species of plant

Acca lanuginosa is a species of plant in the Myrtaceae family that is related to the much more commonly known Pineapple guava. It is endemic to Peru and is considered Endangered by the IUCN.
