= Neomitranthes cordifolia =

Conservation status
- Endangered (IUCN 3.1)

Scientific classification
- Kingdom: Plantae
- Clade: Tracheophytes
- Clade: Angiosperms
- Clade: Eudicots
- Clade: Rosids
- Order: Myrtales
- Family: Myrtaceae
- Genus: Neomitranthes
- Species: N. cordifolia

Binomial name
- Neomitranthes cordifolia (D.Legrand) D.Legrand

Synonyms
- Mitranthes cordifolia D.Legrand

Species of flowering plant

Neomitranthes cordifolia is a species of flowering plant in the family Myrtaceae. It is a shrub or tree endemic to southern Brazil.
