= Neomitranthes =

Scientific classification
- Kingdom: Plantae
- Clade: Tracheophytes
- Clade: Angiosperms
- Clade: Eudicots
- Clade: Rosids
- Order: Myrtales
- Family: Myrtaceae
- Subfamily: Myrtoideae
- Tribe: Myrteae
- Genus: Neomitranthes; D.Legrand

Type species
- Neomitranthes glomerata (D.Legrand) D.Legrand

Genus of flowering plants in the myrtle family

Neomitranthes is a genus of flowering plants in family Myrtaceae first described as a genus in 1977. The entire genus is endemic to Brazil.

== Species ==
13 species are accepted.

1. Neomitranthes amblymitra – Rio de Janeiro, São Paulo
2. Neomitranthes capivariensis – São Paulo
3. Neomitranthes cordifolia – Rio Grande do Sul
4. Neomitranthes gemballae – Paraná, Santa Catarina
5. Neomitranthes glomerata – Paraná, São Paulo, Santa Catarina
6. Neomitranthes gracilis – São Paulo
7. Neomitranthes obscura – C + SE + S Brazil
8. Neomitranthes obtusa – Espírito Santo
9. Neomitranthes pedicellata – São Paulo
10. Neomitranthes pereireana – Rio de Janeiro
11. Neomitranthes regeliana – São Paulo
12. Neomitranthes stictophylla – Espírito Santo
13. Neomitranthes warmingiana – Paraná, São Paulo

Formerly included

moved to other genera: Blepharocalyx Calyptrogenia Myrceugenia

1. Neomitranthes castellanosii – Blepharocalyx eggersii – Lesser Antilles, Guyana, Venezuela, Peru, N Brazil
2. Neomitranthes ekmanii – Calyptrogenia grandiflora – Hispaniola
3. Neomitranthes hatschbachii – Myrceugenia gertii – southern Brazil
4. Neomitranthes langsdorffii – Eugenia guanabarina – eastern Brazil
5. Neomitranthes maria-emiliae – Myrceugenia ovalifolia – Paraná, São Paulo
6. Neomitranthes riedeliana – Eugenia neoriedeliana – southeastern Brazil
