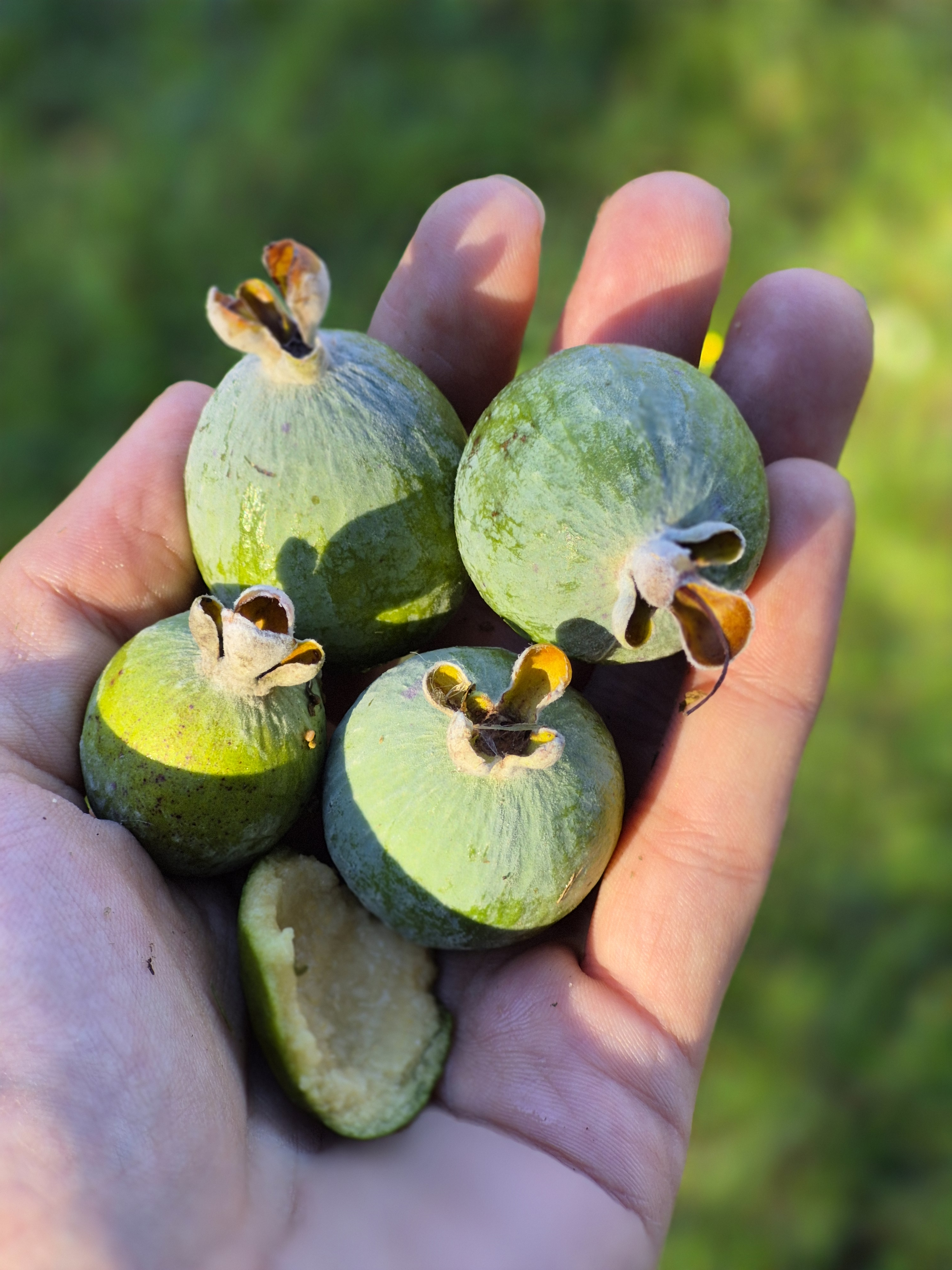
- Ripe fruits in Brazil
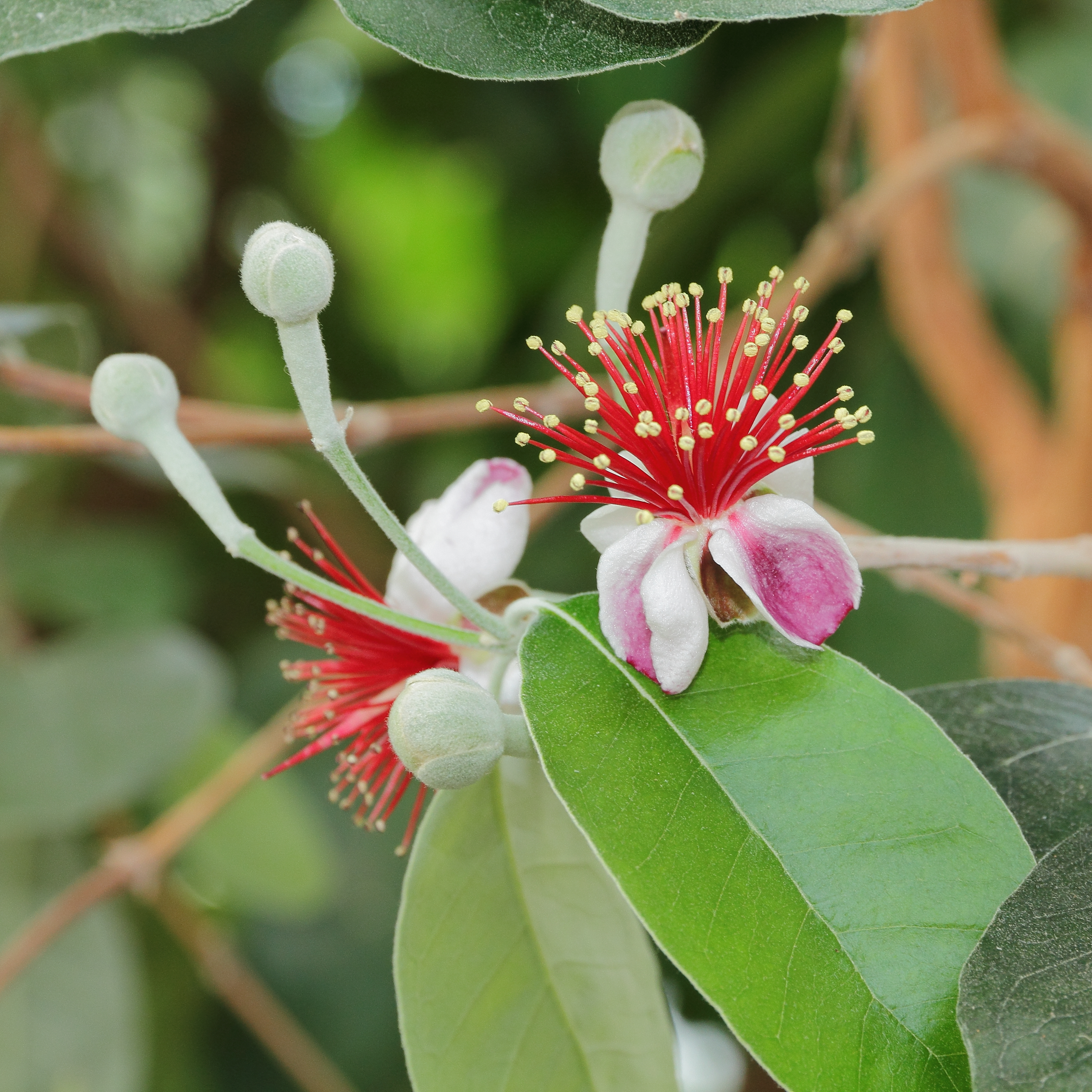
- Foliage and flowers

Conservation status
- Least Concern (IUCN 3.1)

Scientific classification
- Kingdom: Plantae
- Clade: Tracheophytes
- Clade: Angiosperms
- Clade: Eudicots
- Clade: Rosids
- Order: Myrtales
- Family: Myrtaceae
- Subfamily: Myrtoideae
- Tribe: Myrteae
- Genus: Feijoa; O.Berg
- Species: F. sellowiana

Binomial name
- Feijoa sellowiana (O.Berg) O.Berg

Synonyms
- List: Acca sellowiana (O.Berg) Burret; Orthostemon sellowianus O.Berg; Acca sellowiana var. rugosa (Mattos) Mattos; Feijoa coolidegii J.R.Duncan & V.C.Davies; Feijoa obovata (O.Berg) O.Berg; Feijoa schenckiana Kiaersk.; Feijoa sellowiana f. elongata Voronova; Feijoa sellowiana var. rugosa Mattos; Orthostemon obovatus O.Berg

= Feijoa =

Species of plant in the myrtle family

Feijoa sellowiana, also known as Acca sellowiana, is a species of plant in the family Myrtaceae native to Argentina, Brazil, and Uruguay. It is the only species in the monotypic genus Feijoa. It is commonly known as feijoa, (Note: Traditionally pronounced /feɪˈʒoʊ.ə/ fay-ZHO-ə, also pronounced /feɪˈdʒoʊ.ə/ fay-JOH-ə or /ˈfiːdʒoʊ.ə/ fee-JOH-ə in English) quirina (lusitanized from Kaingang: kanê kriyne (Note: /kanɛ̃ kɾiɛᶡɲe/)), or pineapple guava.

== Description ==
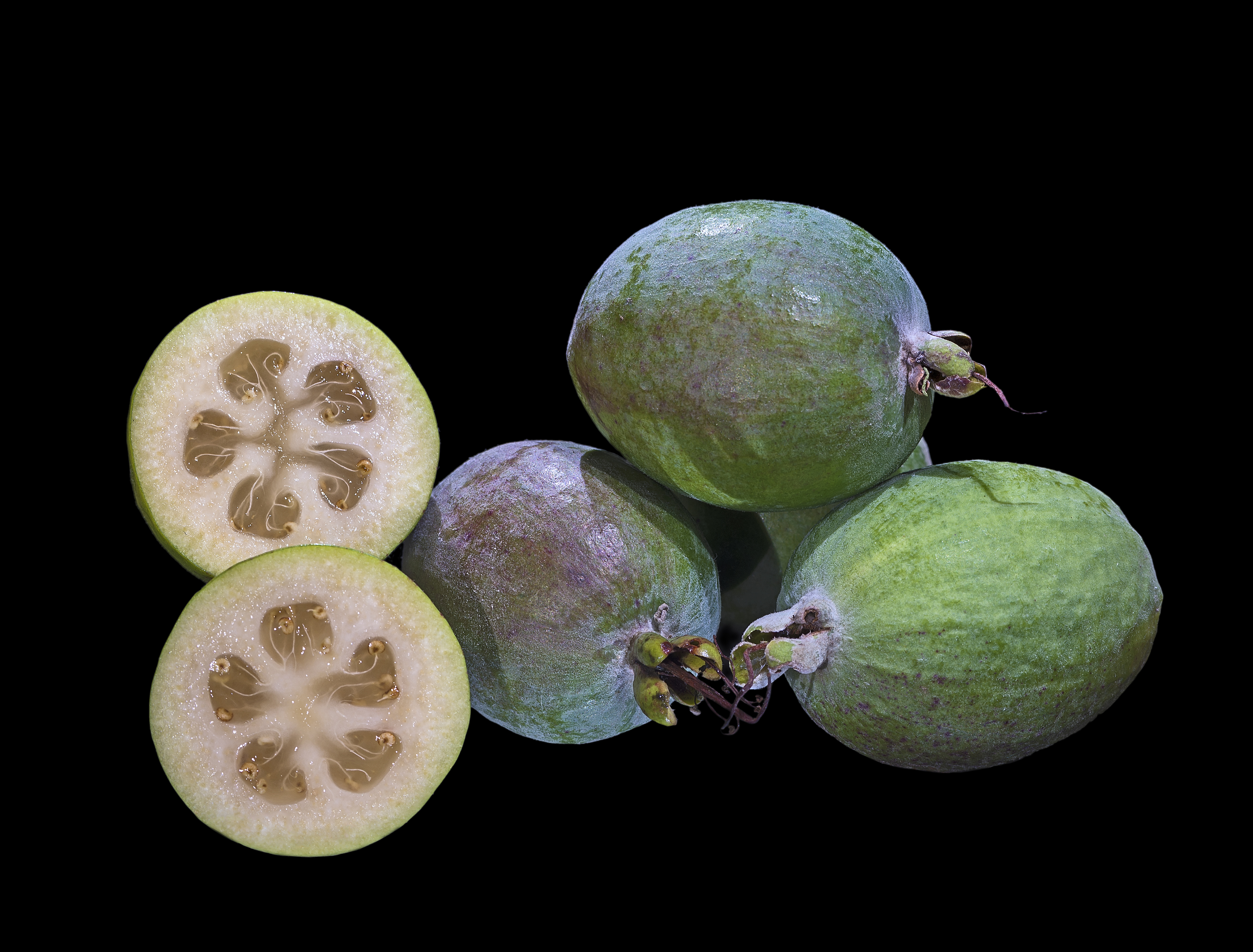
Fruits

Feijoa sellowiana is an evergreen shrub or small tree, 1–7 metres (3.3–23.0 ft) in height. The oblong leaves are about 5 cm (2.0 in) long, dark green on the upper side and white underneath. The flowers have five whitish petals which are puffy, possibly filled with some gas. There are about 25 dark red stamens projecting from the centre. The fruit matures in autumn and the skin is green. Its shape is roughly that of a prolate spheroid, and it is about the size of a chicken egg. It is sweet, slightly tart, with an aromatic bouquet reminiscent of other tropical fruit, such as passion fruit or cherry guava. The flesh is juicy and is divided into a clear, gelatinous seed pulp and a firmer, slightly granular, opaque flesh nearer the skin. The fruit falls to the ground when ripe and at its fullest flavour, but it may be picked from the tree prior to falling to prevent bruising.

The fruit pulp resembles the closely related guava, having a gritty texture. The pulp is used in some natural cosmetic products as an exfoliant. Feijoa fruit has a distinctive, potent smell that resembles that of a fine perfume. The aroma is due to methyl benzoate and related compounds in the fruit.

== Taxonomy ==
Feijoa sellowiana was formerly widely treated in the genus Acca, as Acca sellowiana (O.Berg) Burret, but genetic research showed that the type species of Acca (Acca lanuginosa) is more closely related to the genus Myrrhinium than it is to "A. sellowiana", thus leaving Acca polyphyletic with respect to Myrrhinium if "A. sellowiana" is included. Separated into Feijoa, it is the only species in this genus.

=== Etymology ===
Feijoa sellowiana was named by German botanist, Ernst Berger. The genus is named for João da Silva Feijó, a Portuguese naturalist, and the specific name honours Friedrich Sellow, a German who first collected specimens of Feijoa in southern Brazil.

Other common English names in various countries include pineapple guava, fig guava and guavasteen, although it is not a true guava.

== Distribution and habitat ==
It is native to Northeast Argentina, South and Southeast Brazil, and Uruguay, where it grows in tropical, moist montane forests, tropical, moist lowland forests, tropical, dry forets, as well as in temperate grasslands. In Brazil, it is naturally found around Araucaria angustifolia forests at altitudes more than 900 metres.

== Ecology ==
It is a host plant of Austropuccinia psidii.

== Cultivation ==
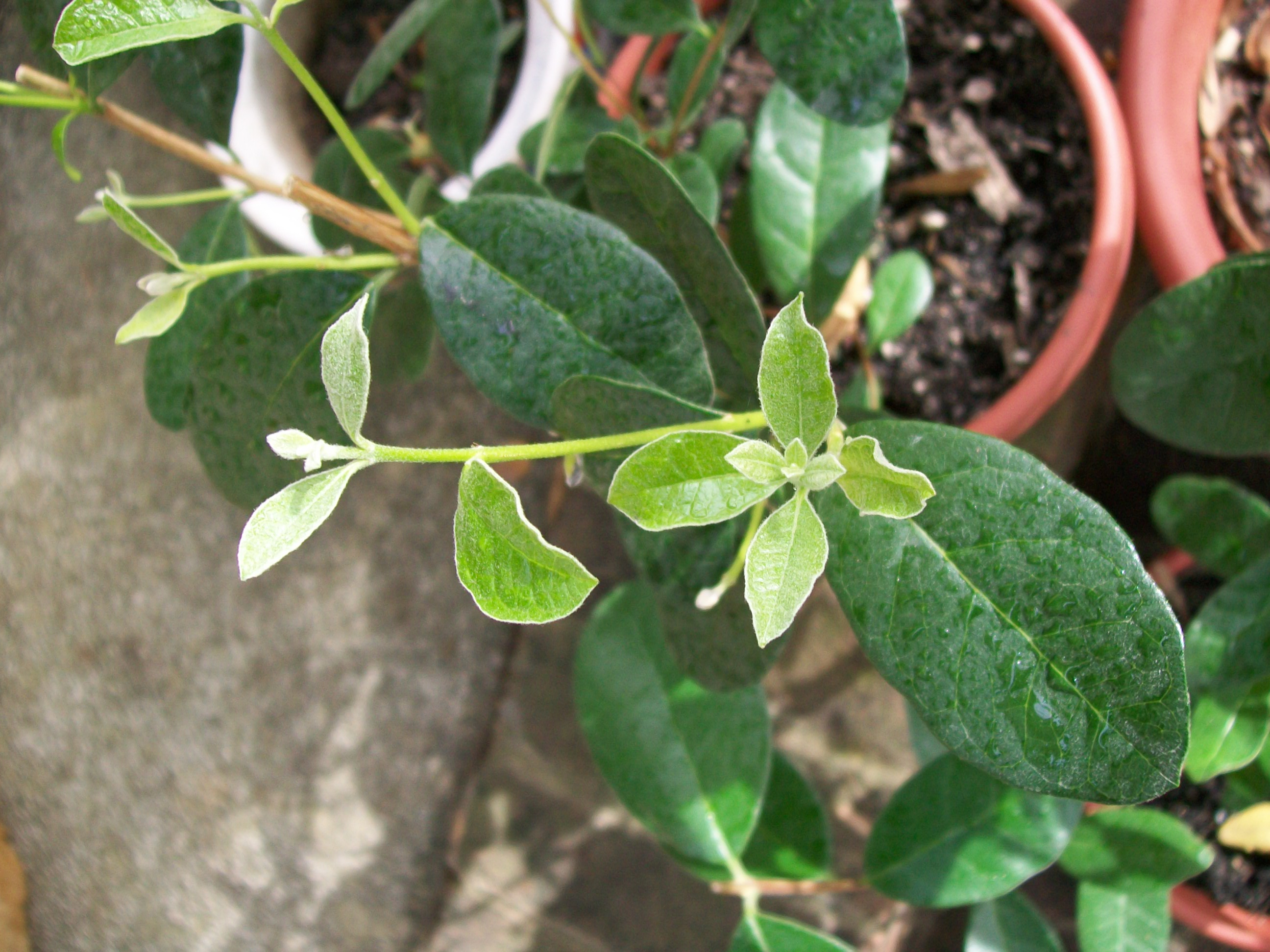
Young feijoa seedling

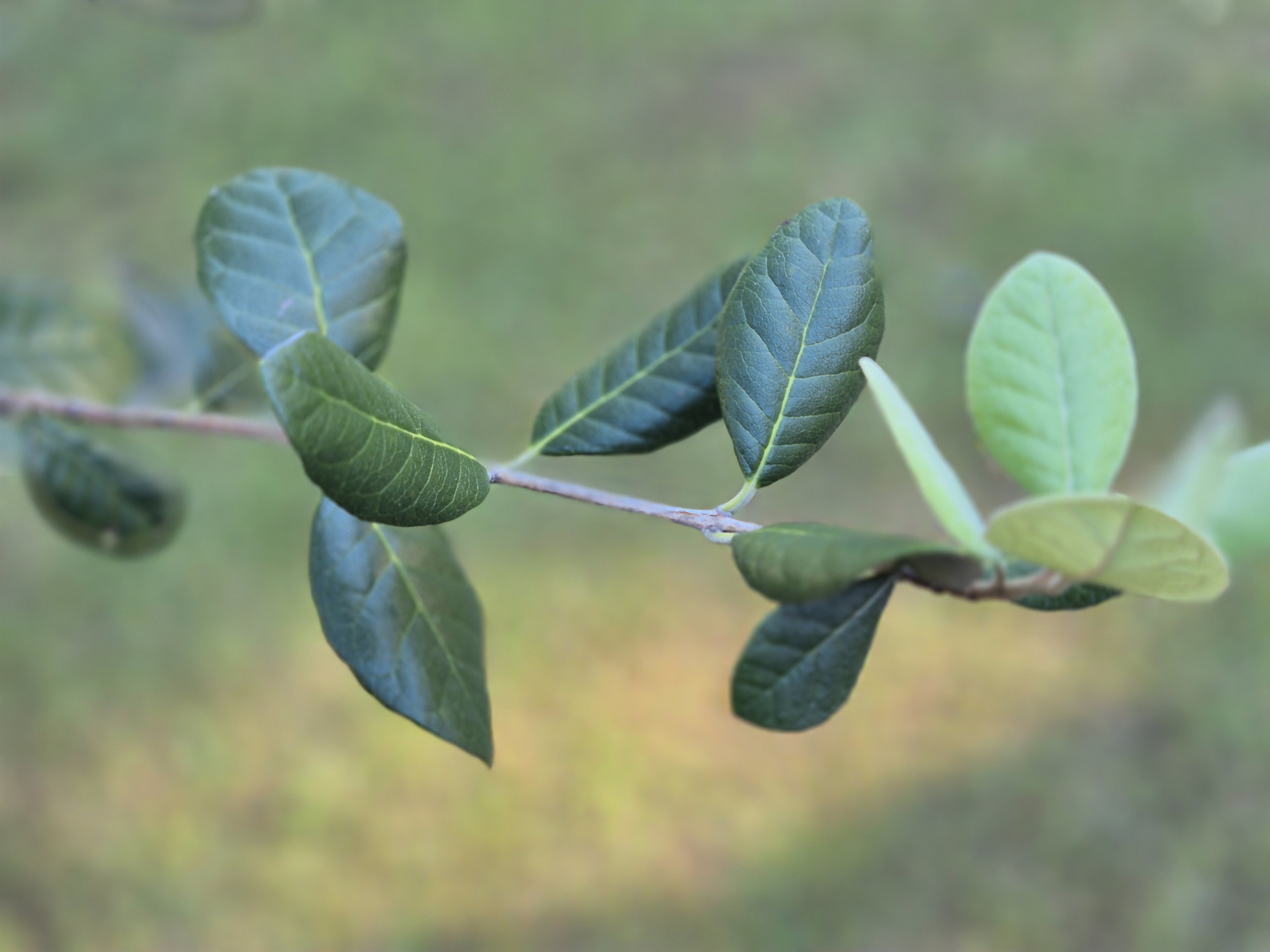
Leaves

The plant is a warm-temperate, subtropical plant that also will grow in the tropics, but requires at least 50 hours of winter chilling to fruit, and is frost-tolerant. When grown from seed, feijoas are noted for slow growth during their first year or two, and young plants, though cold tolerant, can be sensitive to high wind.

In the Northern Hemisphere, the species has been cultivated in the United Kingdom and as far north as western Scotland, but under such conditions it does not fruit every year, as winter temperatures below approximately −9 °C (16 °F) kill the flower buds. Summer temperatures above 32 °C (90 °F) may also have an adverse effect upon fruit set. Feijoas are somewhat tolerant of drought and salt in soils, though fruit production can be adversely affected. Tolerant to partial shade, regular watering is essential while the fruit is maturing.

The main cultivation areas are in countries such as New Zealand, the United States (especially California), and Colombia, rather than feijoa's native region. Some cultivars of F. sellowiana, widely distributed internationally, derive from a small number of introductions of "Uruguayan type" plants. In 1890, Professor Edouard André introduced a specimen or a few specimens of the species from Uruguay to France, which were the origin of the seedlings introduced in California and which later reached New Zealand. Subsequently, Colombia introduced materials from various parts of the world.

Uruguay continues to have breeding and commercialization programs focused on creating cultivars better for commercial production, with better fruit characteristics, such as including thinner skin, smaller seeds and better flavor and color. The program, initiated in 2000 by the Instituto Nacional de Semillas and the Instituto Nacional de Investigación Agropecuaria, has identified 4 varieties registered for commercial development, alongside an expansion of growers and unregistered varieties.

Some grafted cultivars of feijoa are self-fertile. Most are not and require a pollinator. Seedlings may or may not be of usable quality, and may or may not be self-fertile. Feijoas will mature into a sprawly shrub but can be kept successfully as a large container plant, though accommodations will need to be made for the width of the plants, and the need to encourage new growth for fruit production.

Feijoas are occasionally found as landscape plants in Texas, Florida, California, and the maritime Pacific Northwest. They can succeed in greenhouses in temperate parts of the United States, and have been grown in-ground as fruiting trees on the United States east coast in coastal Georgia and South Carolina, as well as in California. Other regions of the United States, such as the southernmost Appalachian Mountains and the immediate coastal region from North Carolina to Delaware, would warrant further investigation.

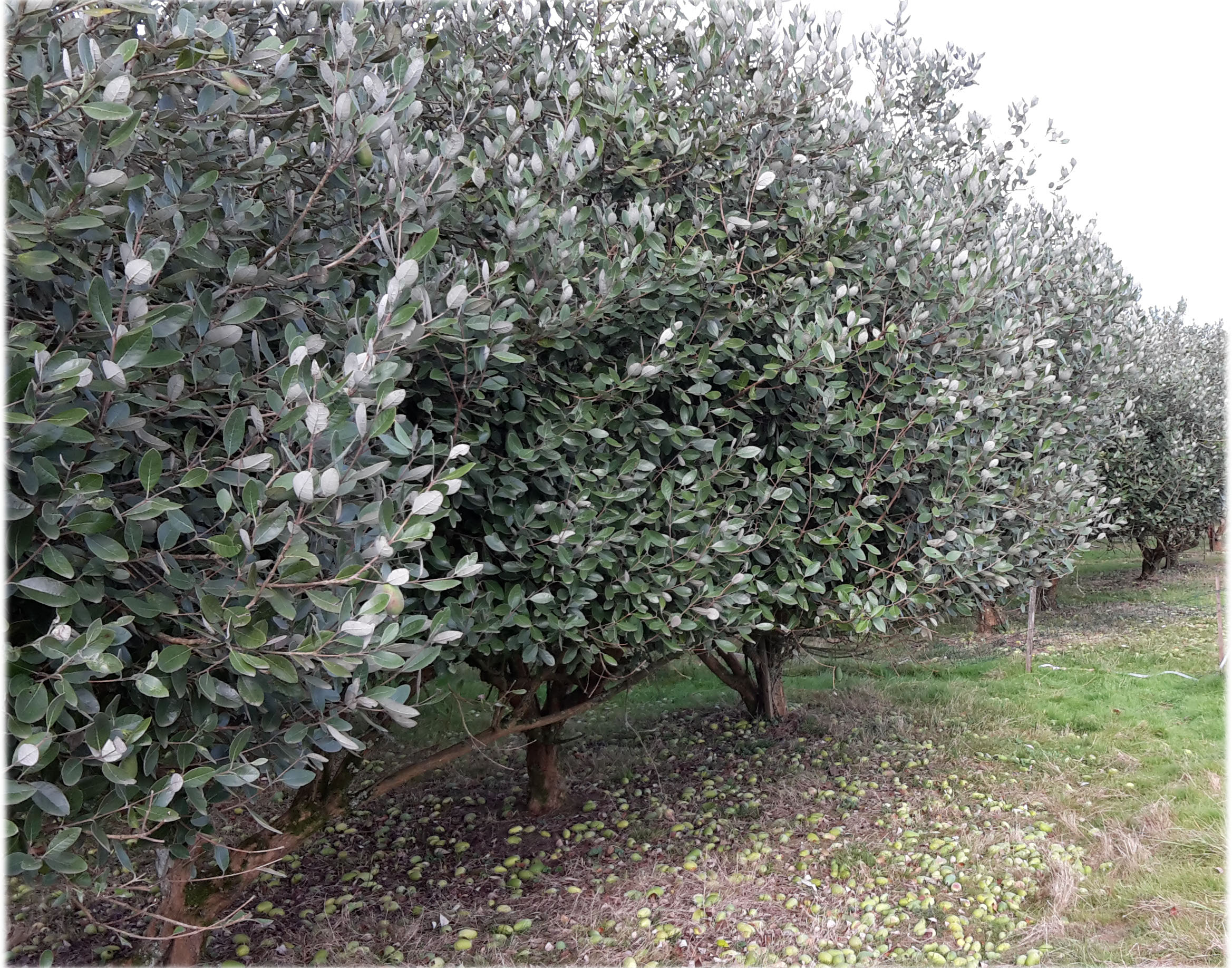
Feijoa orchard with fallen ripe fruit in Dax, Landes, southwestern France

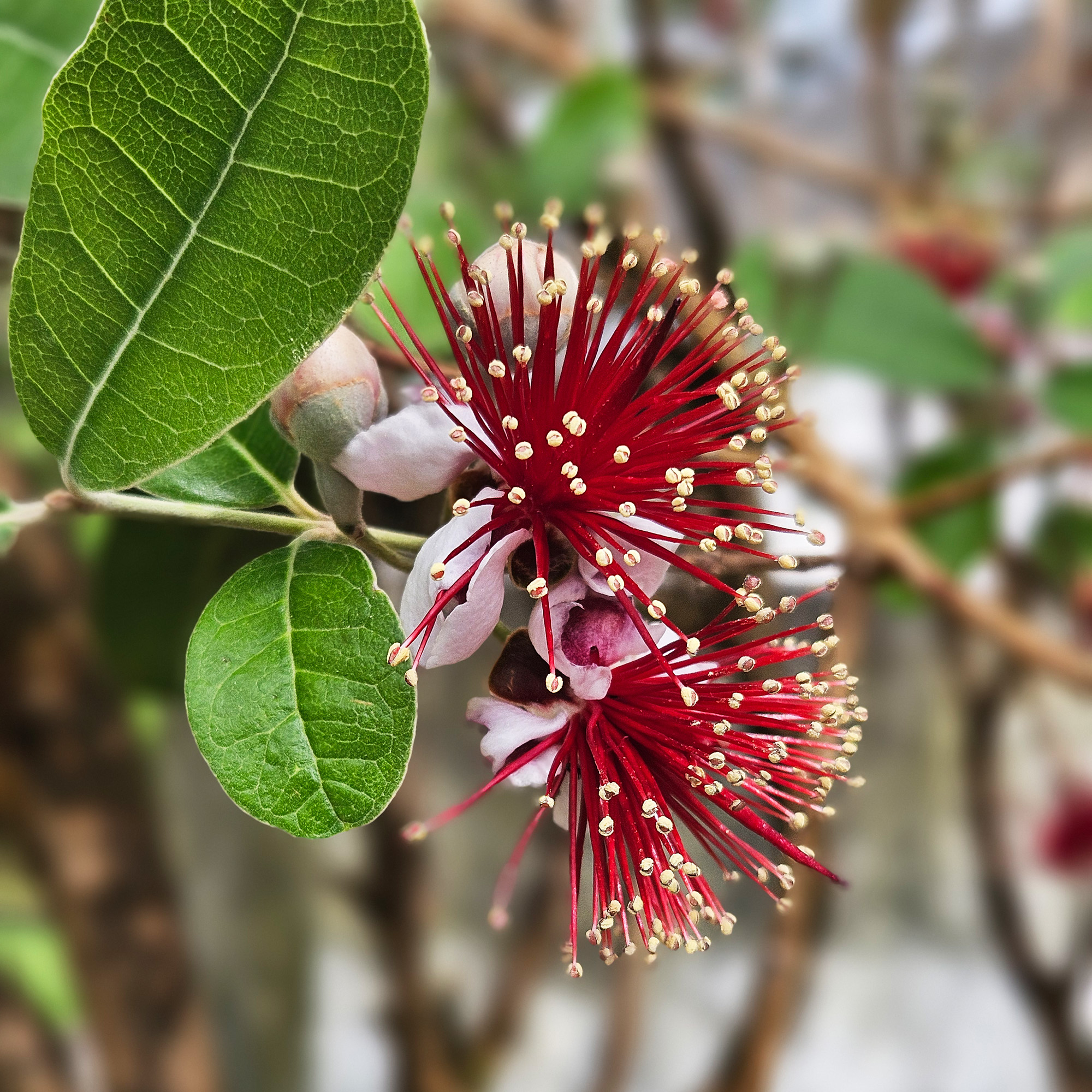
Feijoa sellowiana (O.Berg) O.Berg, Azores

It has been widely grown in New Zealand since the 1920s, and is a popular garden tree there. It is widely cultivated as an ornamental tree and for its fruit. The fruiting season is from March to June. Its pollinators are bees, bumblebees, and medium-sized birds. The silvereye is a pollinator in the cooler parts of the South Island; the blackbird and the Indian myna, which feeds on the sweet, fleshy flower petals, are pollinators further north. In some areas, the trees have been unproductive due to lack of pollinators. The shrub has very few insect pests, but guava moth is a problem in Northland.

In the South Caucasus, feijoa has been cultivated in the southern coastal region of Azerbaijan since 1928; cultivation in neighboring Georgia has gradually increased to about 988 hectares (2,440 acres) in 1986.

== Uses ==
Feijoa sellowiana fruit in is eaten fresh as a dessert fruit, or is and canned or jellied. The fruits are also used to produce juice, alcoholic drinks, and sweets.

Although the skin is edible, the fruit usually is eaten by cutting it in half, then scooping out the pulp with a spoon. The fruit has a juicy, sweet seed pulp and slightly gritty flesh nearer the skin. The flower petals are edible. The most common uses are eating raw, desserts such as sorbet, sweet pies, crumbles, or in salads. They are regularly consumed by birds.

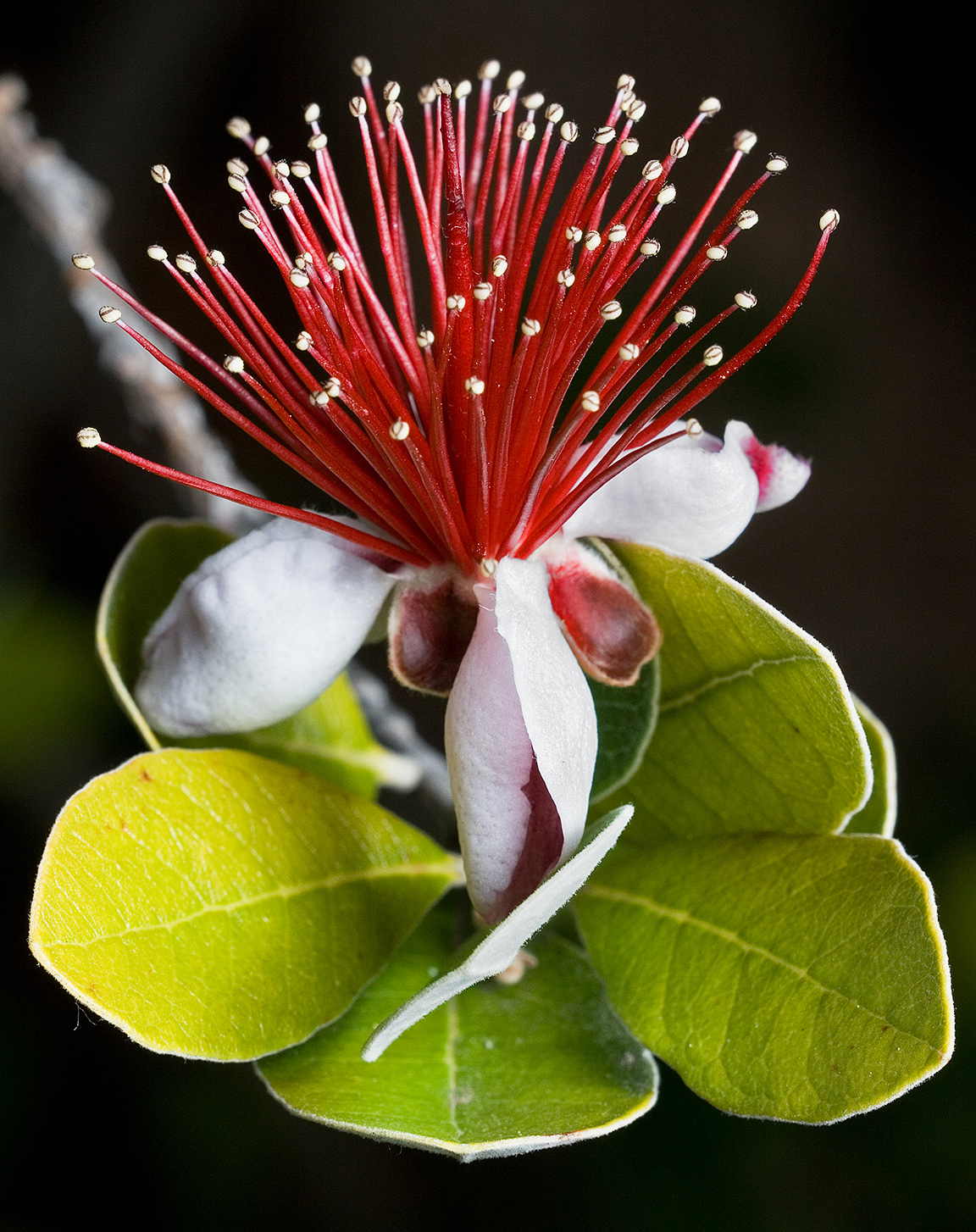
The crisp, spicy-sweet tasting petals of feijoa flowers are edible.

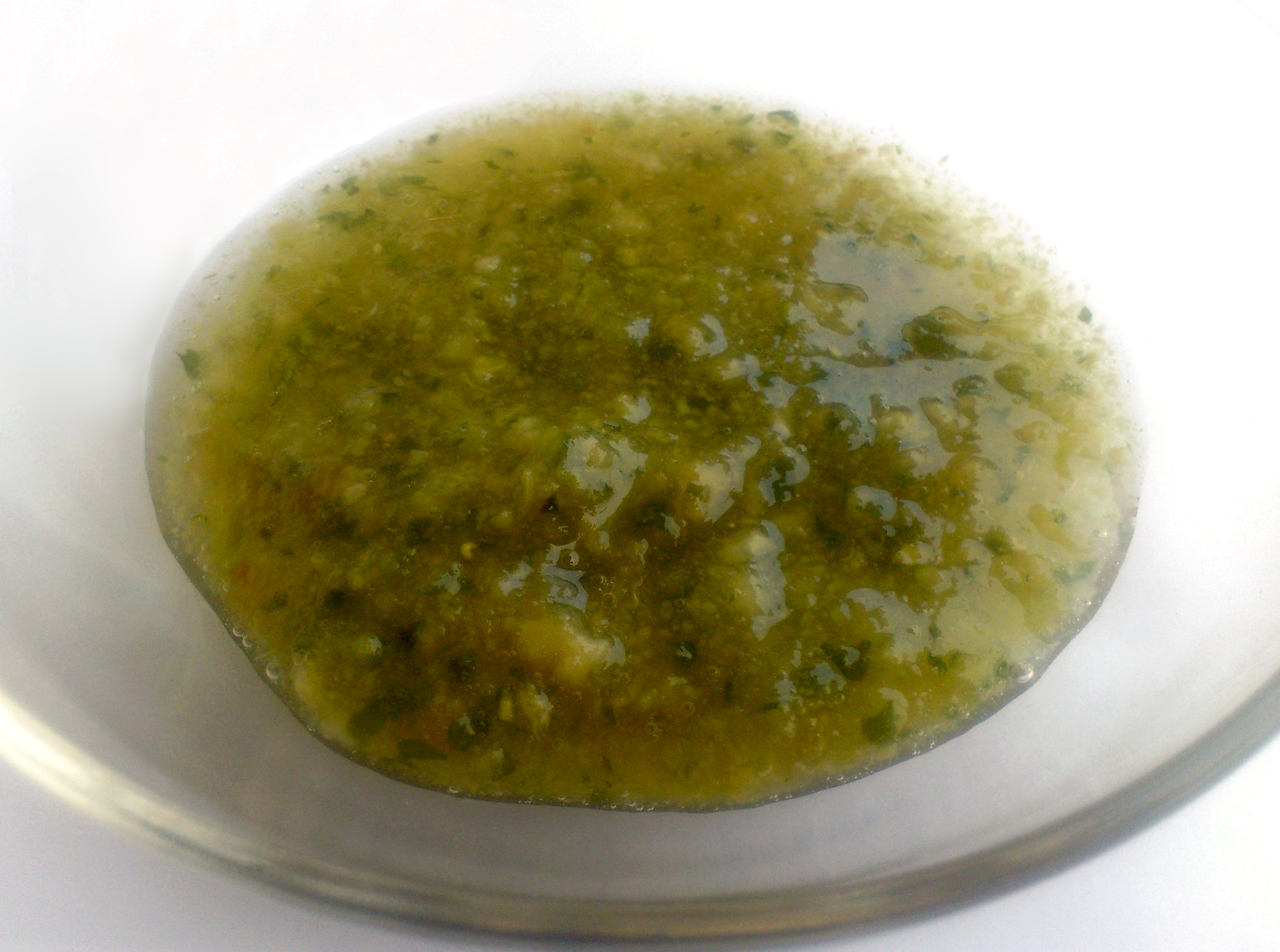
Spread made of mashed raw feijoa

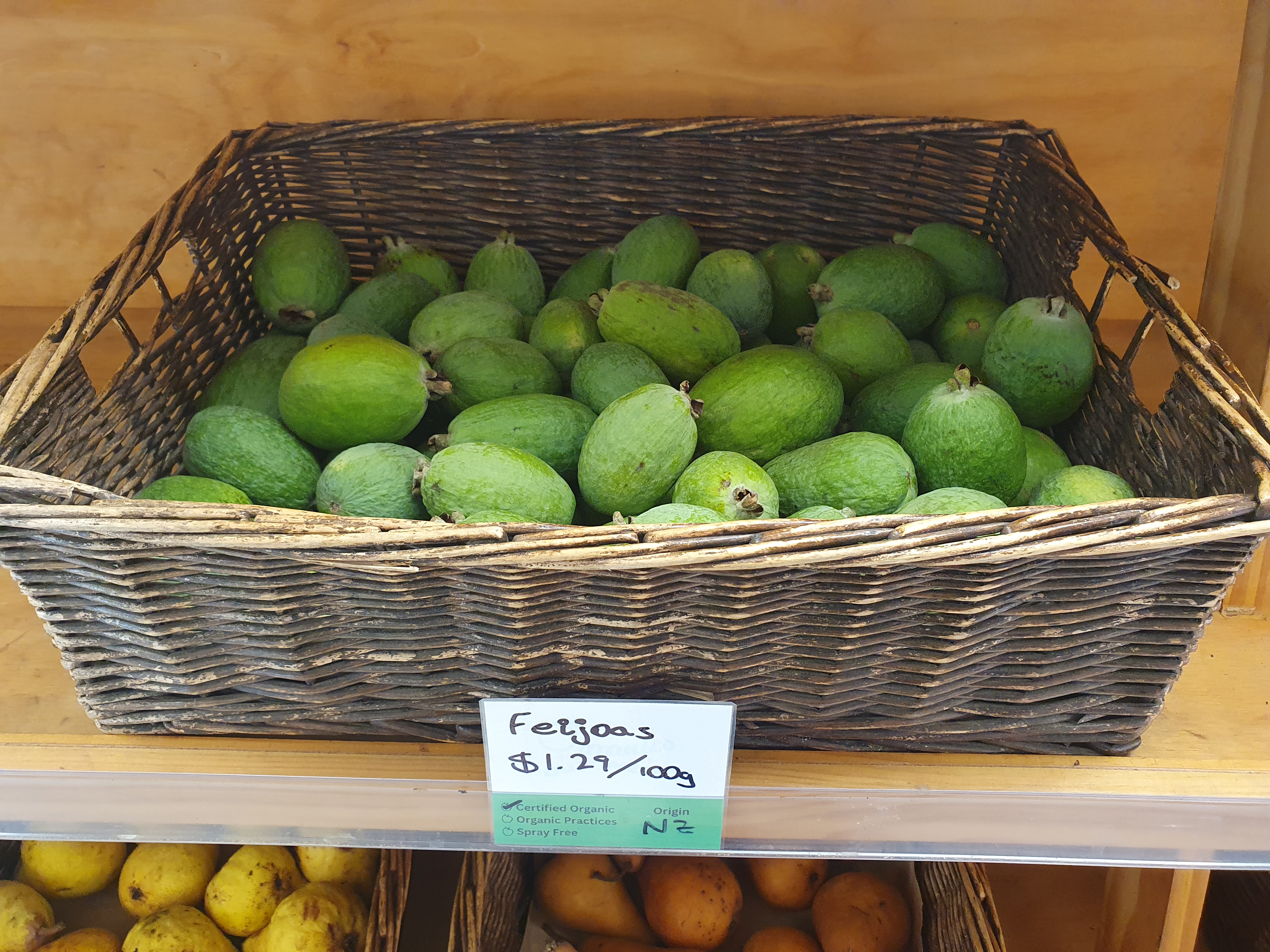
A display of feijoas for sale in Auckland, New Zealand

Ripe fruit is prone to bruising; difficulty maintaining the fruit in good condition for any length of time, along with the short period of optimum ripeness and full flavour, probably explains why feijoas are not exported frequently, and are typically sold close to where they are grown. However, intercontinental shipping of feijoa by sea or air has been successful.

Because of the relatively short shelf life, storekeepers need to be careful to replace older fruit regularly to ensure high quality. In some countries, they also may be purchased at roadside stalls, often at a lower price.

Feijoas may be cool-stored for approximately a month and still have a few days of shelf life at optimum eating maturity. They also may be frozen for up to one year without a loss in quality.

=== Nutrition ===
Feijoa, raw
Nutritional value per 100 g (3.5 oz)
- Energy: 230 kJ (55 kcal)
- Carbohydrates: 12.92 g
- Sugars: 8.2 g
- Dietary fiber: 6.4 g
- Fat: 0.6 g
- Protein: 0.98 g
Vitamins and minerals
| Vitamins | Quantity %DV^{†} |
| Thiamine (B1) | 1% 0.006 mg |
| Riboflavin (B2) | 1% 0.018 mg |
| Niacin (B3) | 2% 0.295 mg |
| Pantothenic acid (B5) | 5% 0.233 mg |
| Vitamin B6 | 4% 0.067 mg |
| Folate (B9) | 6% 23 μg |
| Vitamin C | 37% 32.9 mg |
| Vitamin E | 1% 0.16 mg |
| Vitamin K | 3% 3.5 μg |
| Minerals | Quantity %DV^{†} |
| Calcium | 1% 17 mg |
| Iron | 1% 0.14 mg |
| Magnesium | 2% 9 mg |
| Manganese | 4% 0.084 mg |
| Phosphorus | 2% 19 mg |
| Potassium | 6% 172 mg |
| Sodium | 0% 3 mg |
| Zinc | 1% 0.06 mg |
- Other constituents: Quantity
- Water: 83 g
- Link to USDA Database entry
- ^{†}Percentages estimated using US recommendations for adults, except for potassium, which is estimated based on expert recommendation from the National Academies.

Raw feijoa is 83% water, 13% carbohydrates, and 1% each of fat and protein (table). In a reference amount of 100 grams (3.5 oz), raw feijoa provides 55 calories and is a rich source of vitamin C, providing 40% of the Daily Value, but supplies no other micronutrients in significant amount.
