= Kanakomyrtus =

Scientific classification
- Kingdom: Plantae
- Clade: Tracheophytes
- Clade: Angiosperms
- Clade: Eudicots
- Clade: Rosids
- Order: Myrtales
- Family: Myrtaceae
- Subfamily: Myrtoideae
- Tribe: Myrteae
- Genus: Kanakomyrtus; N.Snow

Genus of shrubs

Kanakomyrtus is a genus of evergreen shrubs in the myrtle family Myrtaceae described as a genus in 2009. The entire genus is endemic to New Caledonia. It is related to Archirhodomyrtus and Rhodomyrtus.

Species

1. Kanakomyrtus dawsoniana N.Snow
2. Kanakomyrtus longipetiolata N.Snow
3. Kanakomyrtus mcphersonii N.Snow
4. Kanakomyrtus myrtopsidoides (Guillaumin) N.Snow
5. Kanakomyrtus prominens N.Snow
6. Kanakomyrtus revoluta N.Snow
