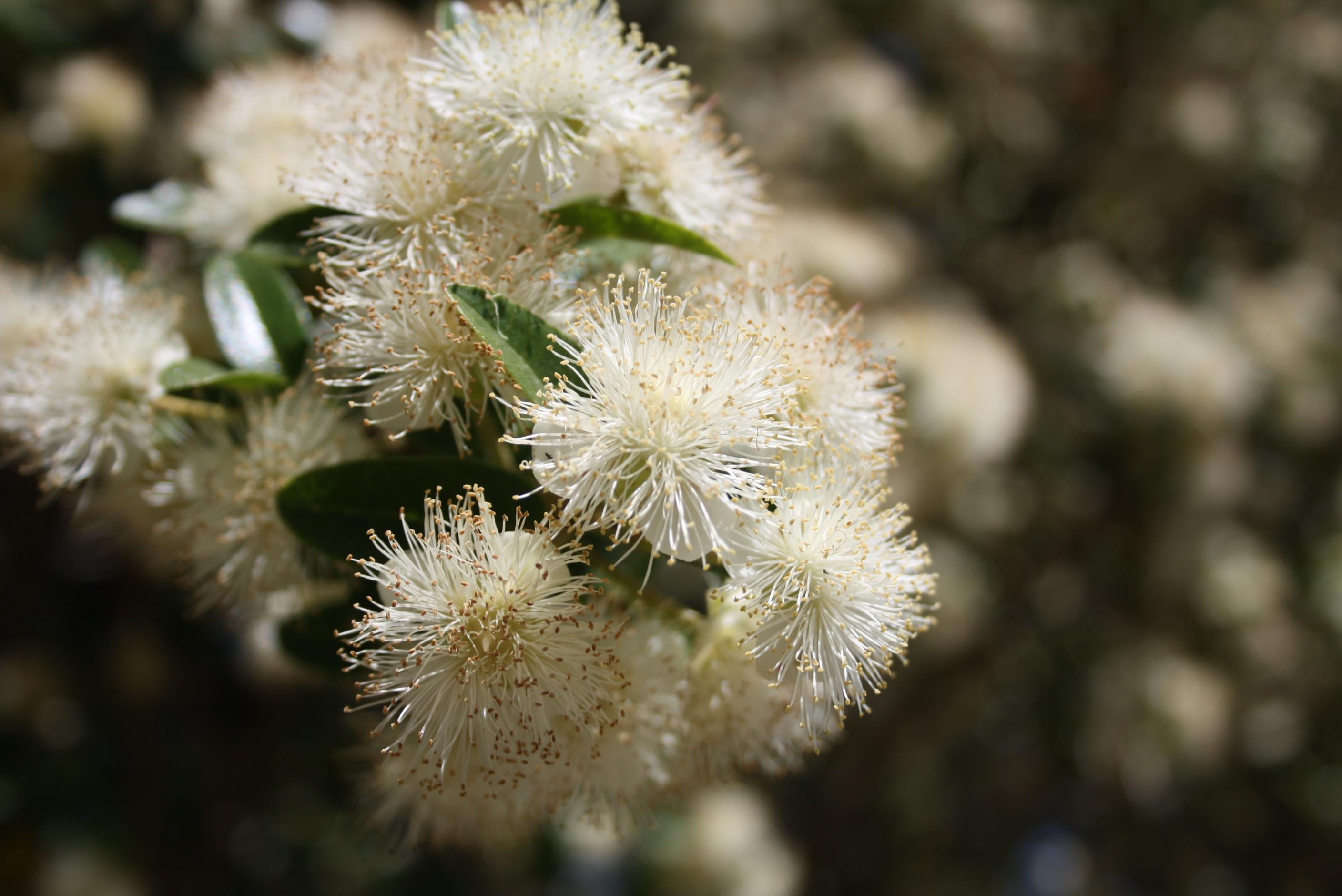

Scientific classification
- Kingdom: Plantae
- Clade: Tracheophytes
- Clade: Angiosperms
- Clade: Eudicots
- Clade: Rosids
- Order: Myrtales
- Family: Myrtaceae
- Subfamily: Myrtoideae
- Tribe: Myrteae
- Genus: Legrandia; Kausel
- Species: L. concinna

Binomial name
- Legrandia concinna (Phil.) Kausel

Synonyms
- Eugenia concinna Phil.; Luma concinna (Phil.) Herter

= Legrandia =

Genus of plants in the myrtle family

Legrandia is a genus of the plant family Myrtaceae, first described as a genus in 1944. It contains only one known species, Legrandia concinna, endemic to the Republic of Chile in South America.
