= João da Silva Feijó =

João da Silva Barbosa or João da Silva Feijó, (1760 in Rio de Janeiro – 1824), was a naturalist, mineralogist and Portuguese soldier, born in Brazil.

João da Silva Feijó studied philosophy and mathematics at the University of Coimbra and adopted the name Feijó in homage to Benito Jerónimo Feijoo, Spanish philosopher, who at the time was respected among natural history students.

In 1778, the Italian professor, Domenico Agostino Vandelli, was part of a group that founded the Natural History Museum in Lisbon. João da Silva was part of this group with Alexandre Rodrigues Ferreira, Manuel da Silva Galvão and Joaquim José da Silva.

The feijoa, a tree that bears green fruits similar to guavas, is named after him.

== Cape Verde ==
Beginning in 1783, scientific voyages under Vandelli were launched. Naturalists were to plan expeditions to various colonies. Feijó arranged to explore the islands of the archipelago of Cape Verde, and arrived there in June 1783. Like his colleagues, he had great difficulty in pursuing his research as an independent man of science. The activities of a young naturalist, who observes and collects objects such as butterflies, plants, shells and minerals, are often regarded with contempt by colonial officials.

He described his exploration of Cape Verde in seven letters sent to the minister Martinho de Mello e Castro and discusses the geography, topography and flora of the island.

The work of Feijó disappointed his sponsor Mello e Castro, who criticized the packaging of shipments and paucity of material sent. It was regretted that Feijó has not proposed any method of exploiting the saltpetre and sulphur which was believed to be readily available in the volcanic regions of Cape Verde.

In 1790, Feijó joined the local military establishment and soon requested that he be allowed to return to Portugal.

In Lisbon, Feijó collaborated with his old friend Alexandre Rodrigues Ferreira, newly returned from the Amazon, to produce herbarium specimens from the Cape Verde material. The German naturalist Heinrich Friedrich Link, visiting Portugal between 1797 and 1799, met his Brazilian colleagues and praised their work.

In 1797, Feijó rewrote some of the text relating to Cape Verde and published a work titled "Itinéraire philosophique".
