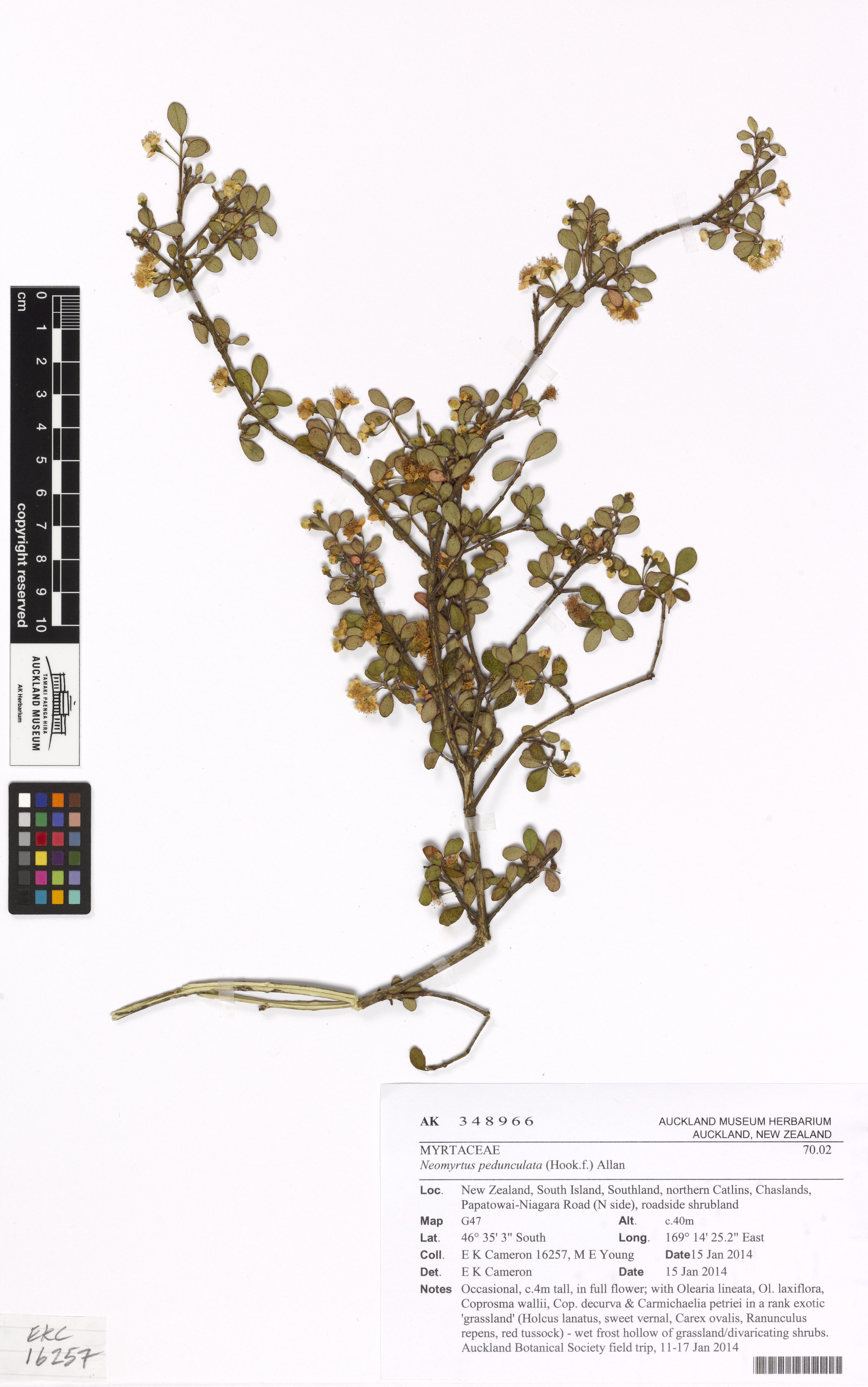

Conservation status
- Least Concern (IUCN 3.1)

Scientific classification
- Kingdom: Plantae
- Clade: Tracheophytes
- Clade: Angiosperms
- Clade: Eudicots
- Clade: Rosids
- Order: Myrtales
- Family: Myrtaceae
- Tribe: Myrteae
- Genus: Neomyrtus; Burret
- Species: N. pedunculata

Binomial name
- Neomyrtus pedunculata (Hook.f.) Allan

Synonyms
- Myrtus pedunculata Hook.f.; Eugenia vitis-idaea Raoul; Myrtus vitis-idaea (Raoul) Druce; Neomyrtus vitis-idaea (Raoul) Burret

= Neomyrtus =

Genus of plants the myrtle family

Neomyrtus is a genus of plants in the family Myrtaceae described in 1941. It contains only one known species, Neomyrtus pedunculata, which is endemic to New Zealand with the common Māori name rōhutu. It is a small tree or shrub up to 8 metres found on both the North Island and the South Island.

== Description and habitat ==
This slender trunked tree is found in lowland to montane forest and often is a conspicuous component of riparian podocarp forest, and in South Island grey scrubland. It is often overlooked unless in flower or fruit. The pale grey to almost silvery bark on slender trunks with open, few to many branches, are upright or spreading. Branchlets are 4 sided with opposite thick, glandular leaves that are pale green oval shaped and paler underneath. Flowers are white or cream, usually solitary, born on long slender pedicles, 10-15mm, in the axilla. Berries are round, red, yellow or orange with 1 - 7 seeds per berry.

== Conservation status ==
The species is assessed as not threatened by the New Zealand Threat Classification System, and of Least Concern by the IUCN Red List.

== Gallery ==
Showing branch form

Underside of leaves

Neomyrtus pedunculata tree

Detail of berries

Branchlet showing square cross section

Flower detail

Flower detail
