= Amomyrtella =

Scientific classification
- Kingdom: Plantae
- Clade: Embryophytes
- Clade: Tracheophytes
- Clade: Spermatophytes
- Clade: Angiosperms
- Clade: Eudicots
- Clade: Rosids
- Order: Myrtales
- Family: Myrtaceae
- Subfamily: Myrtoideae
- Tribe: Myrteae
- Genus: Amomyrtella; Kausel

Genus of flowering plants in the myrtle family

Amomyrtella is a genus of flowering plants in the myrtle family, Myrtaceae, first described as a genus in 1956. It is native to South America, where it is distributed from Ecuador to Argentina.

Species

1. Amomyrtella guilii (Speg.) Kausel, Ark. – S Bolivia (Santa Cruz, Tarija + Chuquisaca Provinces), NW Argentina
2. Amomyrtella irregularis (McVaugh) Landrum & Morocho – Loja Province in Ecuador
