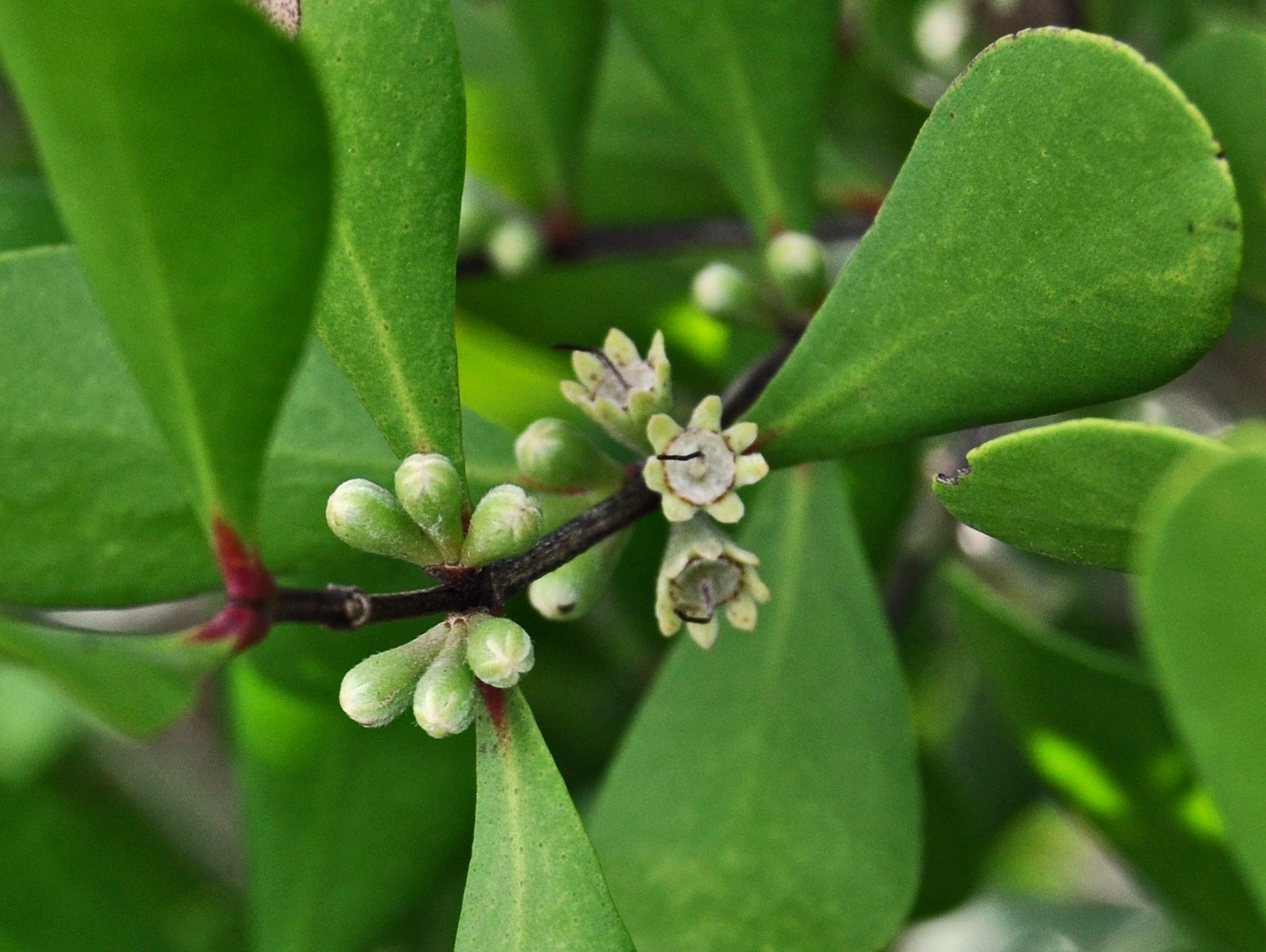
- Osbornia octodonta, the mangrove myrtle

Conservation status
- Least Concern (IUCN 3.1)

Scientific classification
- Kingdom: Plantae
- Clade: Tracheophytes
- Clade: Angiosperms
- Clade: Eudicots
- Clade: Rosids
- Order: Myrtales
- Family: Myrtaceae
- Subfamily: Myrtoideae
- Tribe: Osbornieae
- Genus: Osbornia; F.Muell.
- Species: O. octodonta

Binomial name
- Osbornia octodonta F.Muell.

= Osbornia =

Mangrove myrtle

Genus of flowering plants

Osbornia is a genus of plant in the myrtle family Myrtaceae. The genus is monotypic, meaning that it comprises only one species, namely Osbornia octodonta, commonly known as the myrtle mangrove. It inhabits mangrove areas of Borneo, the Philippines, the Lesser Sunda Islands, the Northern Territory, Queensland, and northern Western Australia. It was first described in 1862 by Ferdinand von Mueller, based on material collected in Trinity Bay in Queensland. He published the description in his tome Fragmenta Phytographiæ Australiæ. It is usually found on the landward side of mangrove forests.
