= Algrizea =

Scientific classification
- Kingdom: Plantae
- Clade: Tracheophytes
- Clade: Angiosperms
- Clade: Eudicots
- Clade: Rosids
- Order: Myrtales
- Family: Myrtaceae
- Subfamily: Myrtoideae
- Tribe: Myrteae
- Genus: Algrizea; Proença & Nic Lugh.

Genus of flowering plants in the myrtle family

Algrizea is a genus in the plant family Myrtaceae first described as a genus in 2006. The entire genus is endemic to the State of Bahia in northeastern Brazil.

Species

1. Algrizea macrochlamys (DC.) Proença & NicLugh. 2006. – Bahia
2. Algrizea minor Sobral, Faria & Proença. 2010. – Bahia
