= Myrtastrum =

Conservation status
- Least Concern (IUCN 3.1)

Scientific classification
- Kingdom: Plantae
- Clade: Tracheophytes
- Clade: Angiosperms
- Clade: Eudicots
- Clade: Rosids
- Order: Myrtales
- Family: Myrtaceae
- Subfamily: Myrtoideae
- Tribe: Myrteae
- Genus: Myrtastrum; Burret
- Species: M. rufopunctatum

Binomial name
- Myrtastrum rufopunctatum (Pancher ex Brongn. & Gris) Burret

Synonyms
- Myrtus rufopunctata Pancher ex Brongn. & Gris

Genus of flowering plants

Myrtastrum is a genus of plants in the Myrtaceae first described as a genus in 1941. It contains only one known species, Myrtastrum rufopunctatum, a shrub or tree endemic to New Caledonia. It is a phylogenetically isolated genus within the tribe Myrteae.
