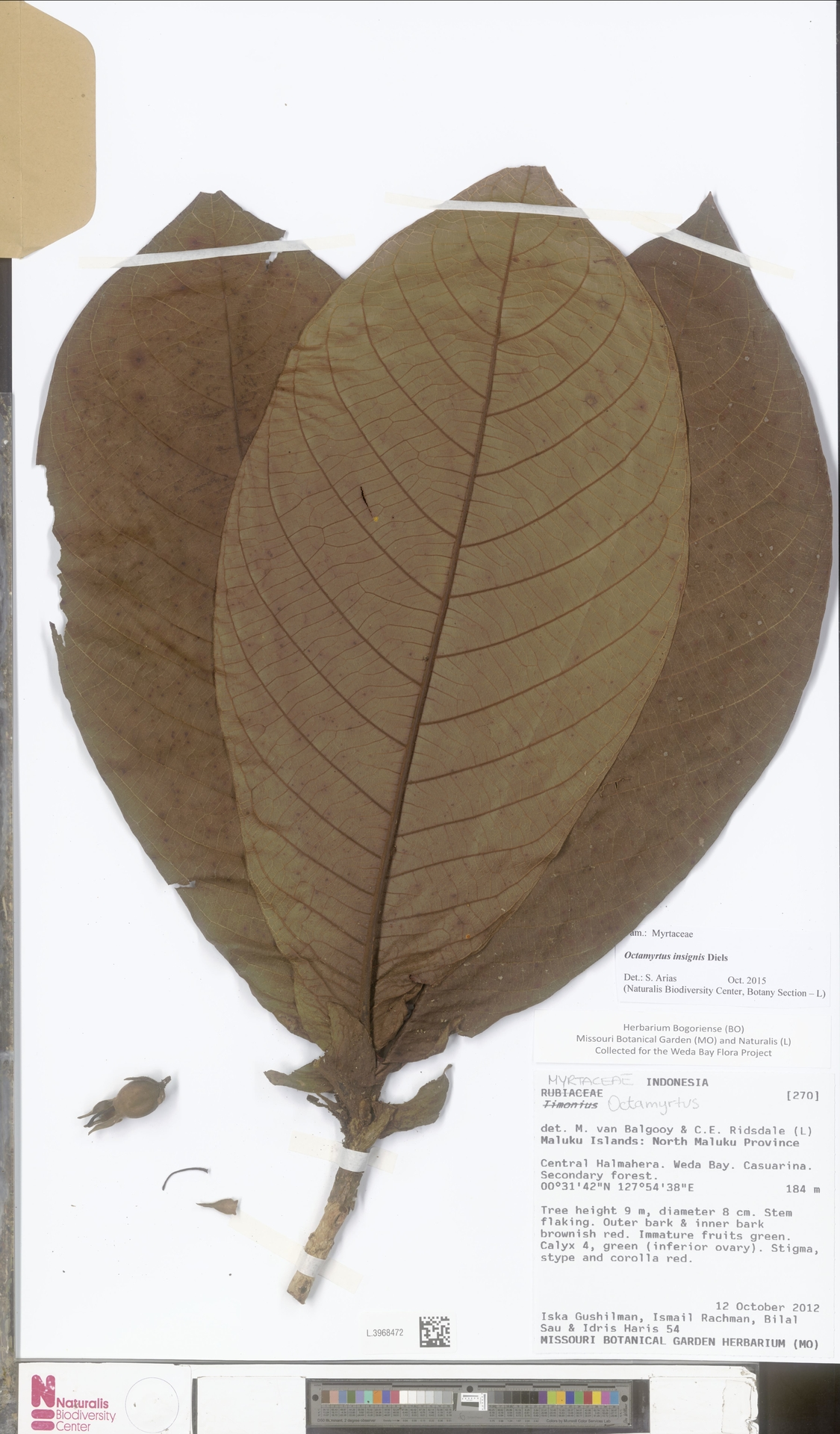

Scientific classification
- Kingdom: Plantae
- Clade: Tracheophytes
- Clade: Angiosperms
- Clade: Eudicots
- Clade: Rosids
- Order: Myrtales
- Family: Myrtaceae
- Subfamily: Myrtoideae
- Tribe: Myrteae
- Genus: Octamyrtus; Trudgen

= Octamyrtus =

Genus of flowering plants in the myrtle family

Octamyrtus is a group of plants in the myrtle family Myrtaceae described as a genus in 1922. It is native to New Guinea and to the nearby Indonesian Province of Maluku.

Species

1. Octamyrtus arfakensis Kaneh. & Hatus. ex C.T.White – West New Guinea
2. Octamyrtus behrmannii Diels – New Guinea
3. Octamyrtus glomerata Kaneh. & Hatus. ex C.T.White – New Guinea
4. Octamyrtus halmaherensis Craven & Sunarti – Halmahera
5. Octamyrtus insignis Diels – New Guinea
6. Octamyrtus pleiopetala Diels – New Guinea, Aru Islands
