= Lindsayomyrtus =

Conservation status
- Least Concern (IUCN 3.1)

Scientific classification
- Kingdom: Plantae
- Clade: Tracheophytes
- Clade: Angiosperms
- Clade: Eudicots
- Clade: Rosids
- Order: Myrtales
- Family: Myrtaceae
- Subfamily: Myrtoideae
- Tribe: Lindsayomyrteae
- Genus: Lindsayomyrtus; B.Hyland & Steenis
- Species: L. racemoides

Binomial name
- Lindsayomyrtus racemoides (Greves) Craven

Synonyms
- Basionym: Eugenia racemoides Greves; Lindsayomyrtus brachyandrus (C.T.White) B.Hyland & Steenis; Metrosideros nigroviridis Steenis; Xanthostemon brachyandrus C.T.White

Genus of trees

Lindsayomyrtus is a monotypic genus in the family Myrtaceae, containling the single species Lindsayomyrtus racemoides, commonly known as Daintree penda. These large trees grow naturally in the rainforests of the Wet Tropics of Queensland in Australia, the Moluccas, New Guinea and New Britain.
