= Eugenia excisa =

Conservation status
- Least Concern (IUCN 3.1)

Scientific classification
- Kingdom: Plantae
- Clade: Tracheophytes
- Clade: Angiosperms
- Clade: Eudicots
- Clade: Rosids
- Order: Myrtales
- Family: Myrtaceae
- Genus: Eugenia
- Species: E. excisa

Binomial name
- Eugenia excisa Urb.

Synonyms
- Calycolpus excisus (Urb.) Bisse

Species of flowering plant

Eugenia excisa is a species of plant in the family Myrtaceae. It is a shrub or tree endemic to eastern Cuba.

The IUCN Red List assesses the species as least concern.
