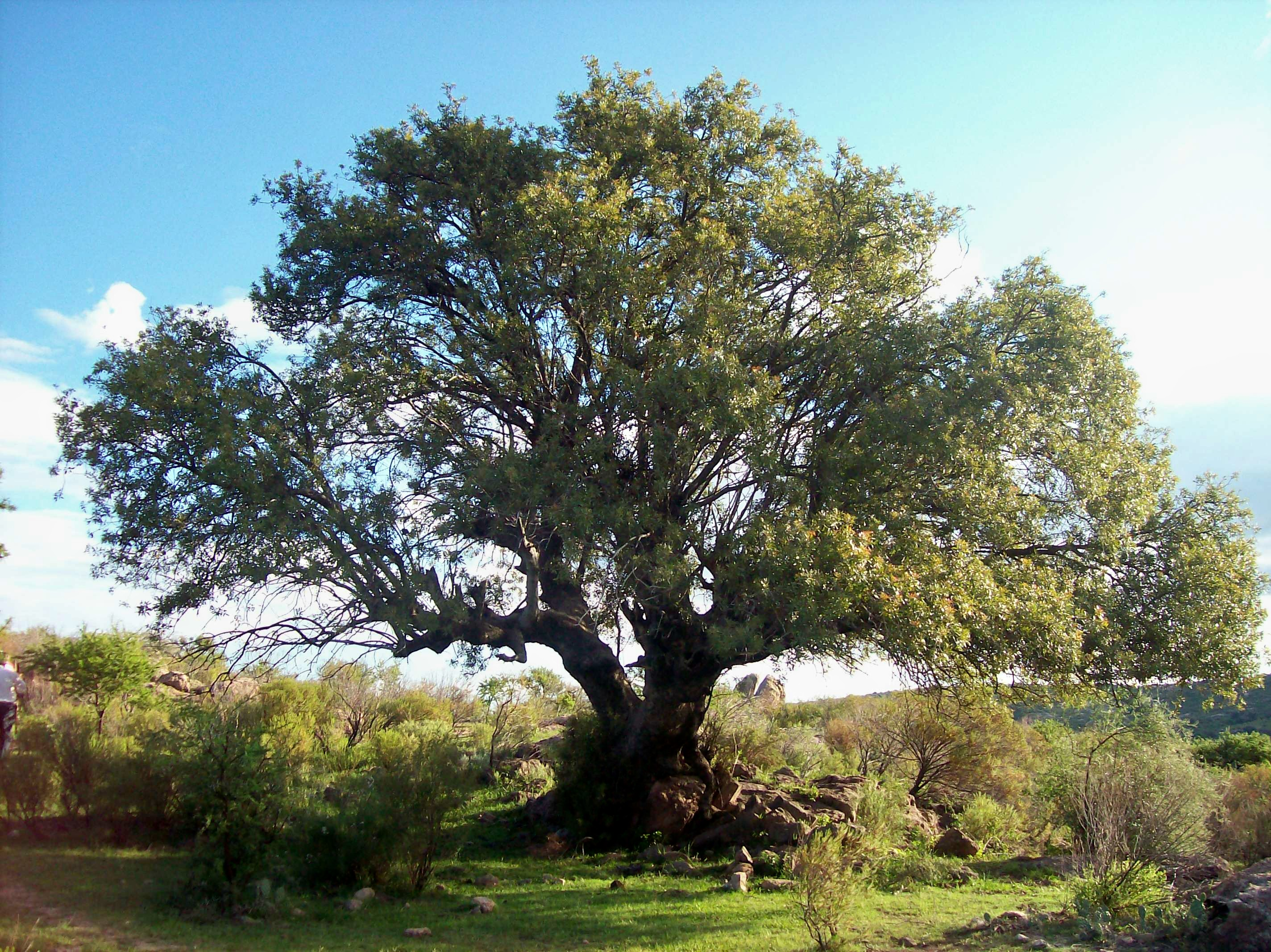
- Blepharocalyx gigantea

Scientific classification
- Kingdom: Plantae
- Clade: Tracheophytes
- Clade: Angiosperms
- Clade: Eudicots
- Clade: Rosids
- Order: Myrtales
- Family: Myrtaceae
- Subfamily: Myrtoideae
- Tribe: Myrteae
- Genus: Blepharocalyx; O.Berg

Type species
- Blepharocalyx acuminatissimus (syn of B. salicifolius) ( Miq.) O.Berg

Synonyms
- Heteromyrtus Blume, illegitimate nam; Temu O.Berg; Marlieriopsis Kiaersk.

= Blepharocalyx =

Genus of flowering plants in the myrtle family

Blepharocalyx is a genus of plant in family Myrtaceae first described as a genus in 1854. It is native to South America and the West Indies.

Accepted species

1. Blepharocalyx cruckshanksii (Hook. & Arn.) Nied. – Chile
2. Blepharocalyx eggersii (Kiaerskou) L.R.Landrum – Lesser Antilles, Venezuela, Guyana, Peru, Brazil
3. Blepharocalyx myriophyllus Mattos – Minas Gerais
4. Blepharocalyx salicifolius (Kunth.) O.Berg – Brazil, Bolivia, Peru, Ecuador, Paraguay, Uruguay, N Argentina
