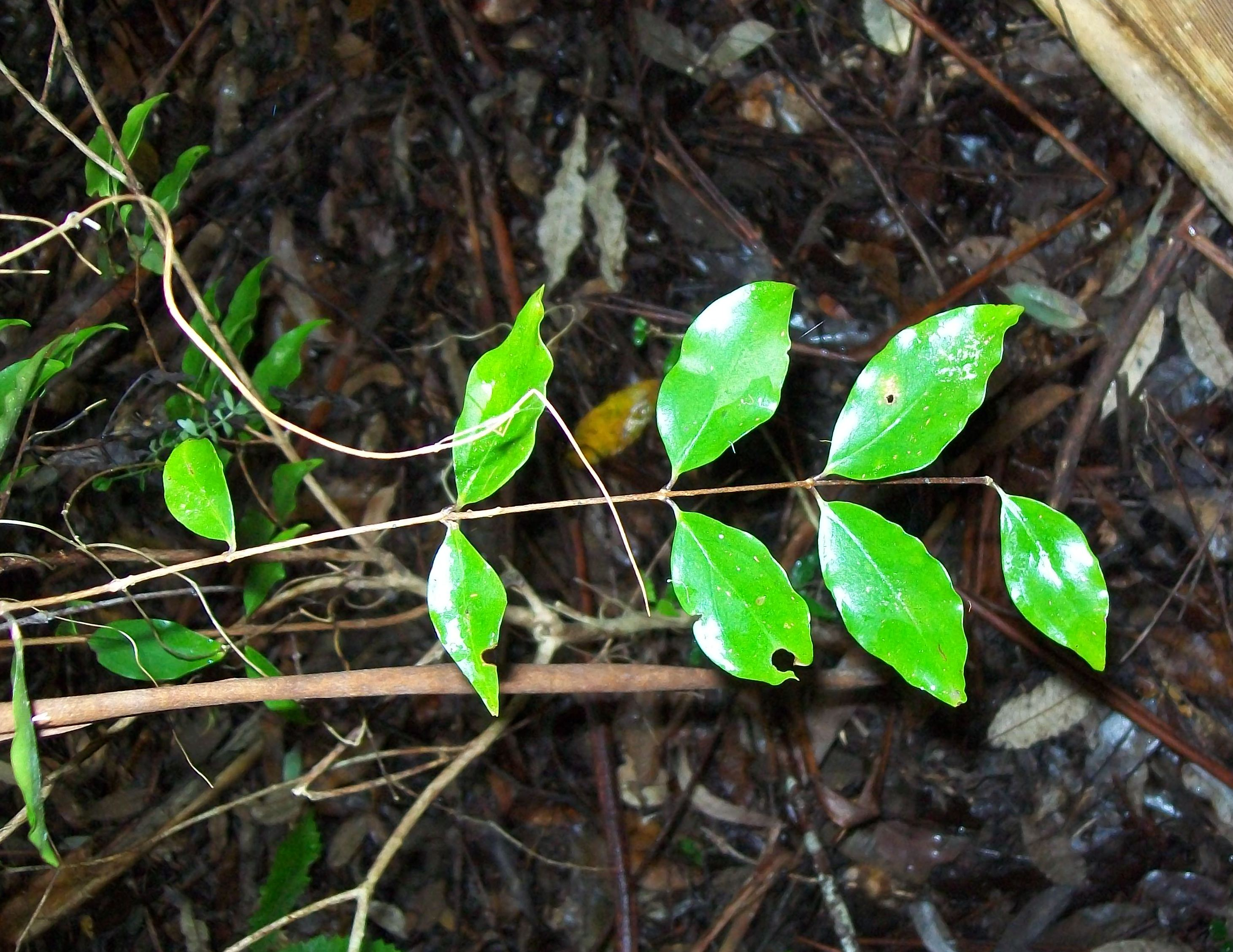
- Archirhodomyrtus beckleri

Scientific classification
- Kingdom: Plantae
- Clade: Tracheophytes
- Clade: Angiosperms
- Clade: Eudicots
- Clade: Rosids
- Order: Myrtales
- Family: Myrtaceae
- Subfamily: Myrtoideae
- Tribe: Myrteae
- Genus: Archirhodomyrtus (Nied.) Burret

= Archirhodomyrtus =

Genus of flowering plants in the myrtle family

Archirhodomyrtus is a genus of flowering plants in the myrtle family, Myrtaceae, describe as a genus in 1941. There are five known species, four native to New Caledonia and one native to Australia.

These are trees and shrubs with oppositely arranged leaves and flowers in the leaf axils. Flowers are solitary, paired, or in threes. There are 5 sepals, 5 petals, and many stamens. The fruit is a smooth berry with many seeds.

Species

1. Archirhodomyrtus baladensis – New Caledonia
2. Archirhodomyrtus beckleri – rose myrtle – Queensland, New South Wales
3. Archirhodomyrtus paitensis – New Caledonia
4. Archirhodomyrtus turbinata – New Caledonia
5. Archirhodomyrtus vieillardi – New Caledonia
