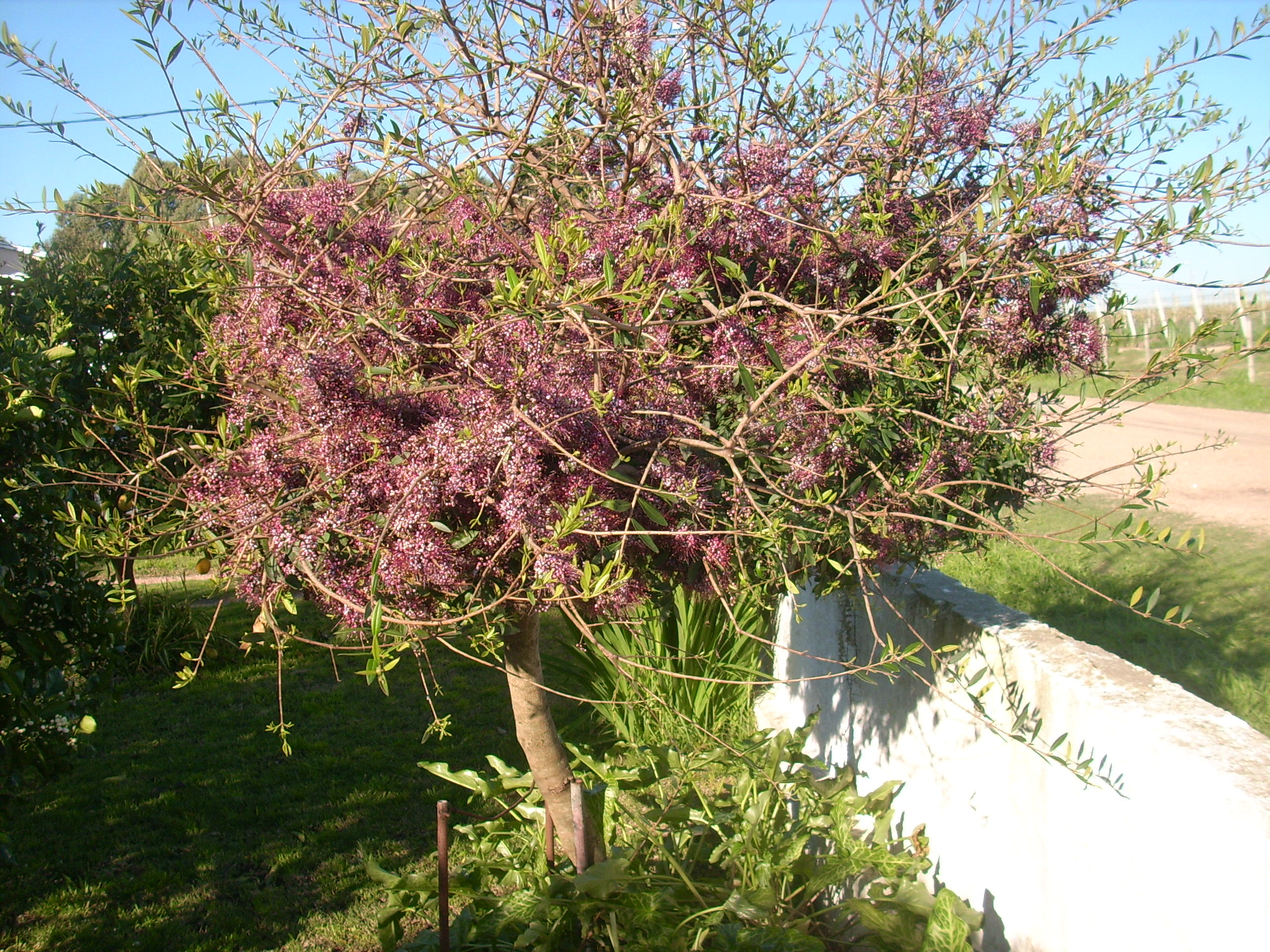

Conservation status
- Least Concern (IUCN 3.1)

Scientific classification
- Kingdom: Plantae
- Clade: Tracheophytes
- Clade: Angiosperms
- Clade: Eudicots
- Clade: Rosids
- Order: Myrtales
- Family: Myrtaceae
- Subfamily: Myrtoideae
- Tribe: Myrteae
- Genus: Myrrhinium; Schott
- Species: M. atropurpureum

Binomial name
- Myrrhinium atropurpureum Schott

Synonyms
- Felicianea Cambess.; Tetrastemon Hook. & Arn.; Felicianea rubriflora Cambess.; Myrrhinium octandrum (Benth.) Mattos; Tetrastemon loranthoides Hook. & Arn.; Myrrhinium peruvianum O.Berg; Myrrhinium rubriflorum O.Berg; Myrrhinium sarcopetalum Lem.; Myrrhinium lanceolatum Burret; Myrrhinium loranthoides (Hook. & Arn.) Burret

= Myrrhinium =

Genus of plants in the myrtle family

Myrrhinium is a genus of plants in the Myrtaceae first described as a genus in 1827. It contains only one recognized species, Myrrhinium atropurpureum, native to South America (Colombia, Ecuador, Peru, S + SE Brazil, Uruguay, N Argentina).

Varieties

1. Myrrhinium atropurpureum var. atropurpureum – SE Brazil
2. Myrrhinium atropurpureum var. octandrum Benth. – (Colombia, Ecuador, Peru, S Brazil, Uruguay, N Argentina
