= Leslie R. Landrum =

American botanist

Leslie Roger Landrum
- Died: 1946
- Education: University of Michigan
- Scientific career
- Fields: Botany
- Workplaces: Arizona State University
- Author abbrev. (botany): Landrum

Leslie Roger Landrum (born 1946) is an American botanist serving as senior research scientist at Arizona State University School of Life Sciences, and curator of the ASU Vascular Plant Herbarium. He attained M.S. and Ph.D. degrees from the University of Michigan, and has been at Arizona State University since 1986.

From 1969 to 1973, he worked with the Peace Corps at the Forestry School of the University of Chile, where he gained an interest in the flora of South America, particularly the myrtle family (Myrtaceae). Since then, he has published descriptions of new genera and species within the South American Myrtaceae, devoting particular study to the genus Psidium (which includes the commercially important guava).

Other concentrations include the Chilean species of the widespread genus Berberis, the usage of computer models in evaluating methods of phylogenetic analysis, and serving on a committee of botanists (including D.J. Pinkava) working on a new manual of the vascular plants of Arizona to replace the aging Arizona Flora by Kearney and Peebles (last updated in 1960).

He is on the editorial board of the Journal of The Arizona–Nevada Academy of Science, and since 2005, he has been the editor of Canotia: A New Journal of Arizona Botany.

Landum is one of the original scientists to participate in the Ask A Biologist program and the subject of the "Smashing Success" article detailing his work with ASU Vascular Plant Herbarium.
