= Otto Karl Berg =

German botanist and pharmacist

- Born: 15 August 1815; Stettin, German Confederation
- Died: 20 November 1866 (aged 51); Berlin, German Confederation
- Scientific career
- Fields: Botanist
- Workplaces: University of Berlin
- Author abbrev. (botany): O.Berg

Otto Karl Berg (15 August 1815 in Stettin – 20 November 1866 in Berlin) was a German botanist and pharmacist. The official abbreviation of his name, in botany, is O. Berg.

He was the son of Johann Friedrich and Wilhelmine Friederike Berg. He studied pharmaceutical botany at the University of Berlin and published his first Handbuch der Pharmazeutischen Botanik ("Handbook on Pharmaceutical Botany") as he graduated in 1845. In 1848, he married Caroline Albertine Florentine Witthaus, with whom he had six children.

He joined the faculty of Botany and Pharmacology at the University of Berlin in 1849, where he specialized in South American flora. In 1862 he was appointed associate professor, and during his time in that position, he helped to make an independent discipline of pharmacology.

== Works ==
- Handbuch der Pharmazeutischen Botanik. 1845
- Charakteristik der für die Arzneikunde und Technik wichtigsten Pflanzengenera in Illustrationen nebst erläuterndem Text. 1848 (Digital edition from 1845 by the University and State Library Düsseldorf)
- Handbuch der pharmaceutischen Botanik. Band 1: Botanik . Nitze, Berlin 2. Aufl. 1850 Digital edition by the University and State Library Düsseldorf
- with Carl Friedrich Schmidt (1811–1890), Darstellung und Beschreibung sämtlicher in den Pharmacopoea Borussica aufgeführten offizinellen Gewächse. 1853
- Revisio Myrtacearum Americae hucusque cognitarum. 1855
- Flora Brasiliensis Myrtographia.... 1855
- Pharmazeutische Warenkunde. 1863 Digital edition by the University and State Library Düsseldorf
- Anatomischer Atlas zur pharmazeutischen Warenkunde. 1865
- Die Chinarinden der pharmakognostischen Sammlung. 1865
- Atlas der officinellen Pflanzen . Vol.1–4 . Felix, Leipzig 2nd ed. 1893–1902 Digital edition by the University and State Library Düsseldorf
