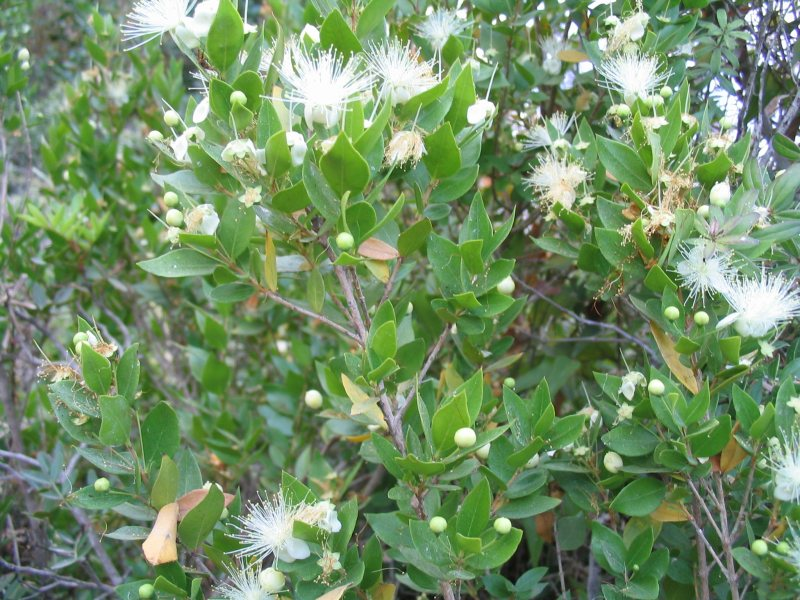
- Myrtus communis foliage and flowers

Scientific classification
- Kingdom: Plantae
- Clade: Tracheophytes
- Clade: Angiosperms
- Clade: Eudicots
- Clade: Rosids
- Order: Myrtales
- Family: Myrtaceae; Juss.

Genera
- About 130; see list

= Myrtaceae =

Myrtaceae Temporal range: Santonian - recent

Myrtle family of plants

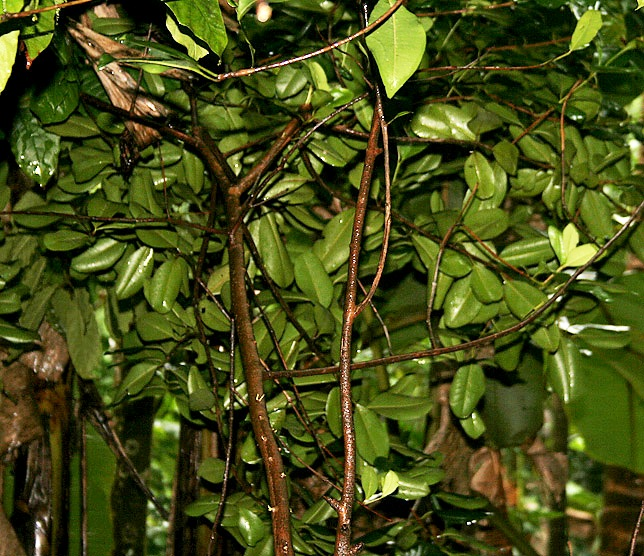
Pimenta dioica

Myrtaceae (/mərˈteɪsiˌaɪ, -siːˌiː/), the myrtle family, is a family of dicotyledonous plants placed within the order Myrtales. Myrtle, pōhutukawa, bay rum tree, clove, guava, acca (feijoa), allspice, and eucalyptus are some notable members of this group. All species are woody, contain essential oils, and have flower parts in multiples of four or five. The leaves are evergreen, alternate to mostly opposite, simple, and usually entire (i.e., without a toothed margin). The flowers have a base number of five petals, though in several genera, the petals are minute or absent. The stamens are usually very conspicuous, brightly coloured, and numerous.

== Evolutionary history ==
Scientists hypothesize that the family Myrtaceae arose between 60 and 56 million years ago (Mya) during the Paleocene era. Pollen fossils have been sourced to the ancient supercontinent Gondwana. The breakup of Gondwana during the Cretaceous period (145 to 66 Mya) geographically isolated disjunct taxa and allowed for rapid speciation; in particular, genera once considered members of the now-defunct Leptospermoideae alliance are now isolated within Oceania. Generally, experts agree that vicariance is responsible for the differentiation of Myrtaceae taxa, except in the cases of Leptospermum species now located on New Zealand and New Caledonia, islands which may have been submerged at the time of late Eocene differentiation.

== Diversity ==
A 2016 paper estimates that Myrtaceae includes about 5,950 species in about 132 genera. The family has a wide distribution in tropical and warm-temperate regions of the world, and is common in many of the world's biodiversity hotspots. Genera with capsular fruits such as Eucalyptus, Corymbia, Angophora, Leptospermum, and Melaleuca are absent from the Americas, apart from Metrosideros in Chile and Argentina. Genera with fleshy fruits have their greatest concentrations in eastern Australia and Malesia (the Australasian realm) and the Neotropics. Eucalyptus is a dominant, nearly ubiquitous genus in the more mesic parts of Australia and extends north sporadically to the Philippines. Eucalyptus regnans is the tallest flowering plant in the world. Other important Australian genera are Callistemon (bottlebrushes), Syzygium, and Melaleuca (paperbarks). Species of the genus Osbornia, native to Australasia, are mangroves. Eugenia, Myrcia, and Calyptranthes are among the larger genera in the neotropics.

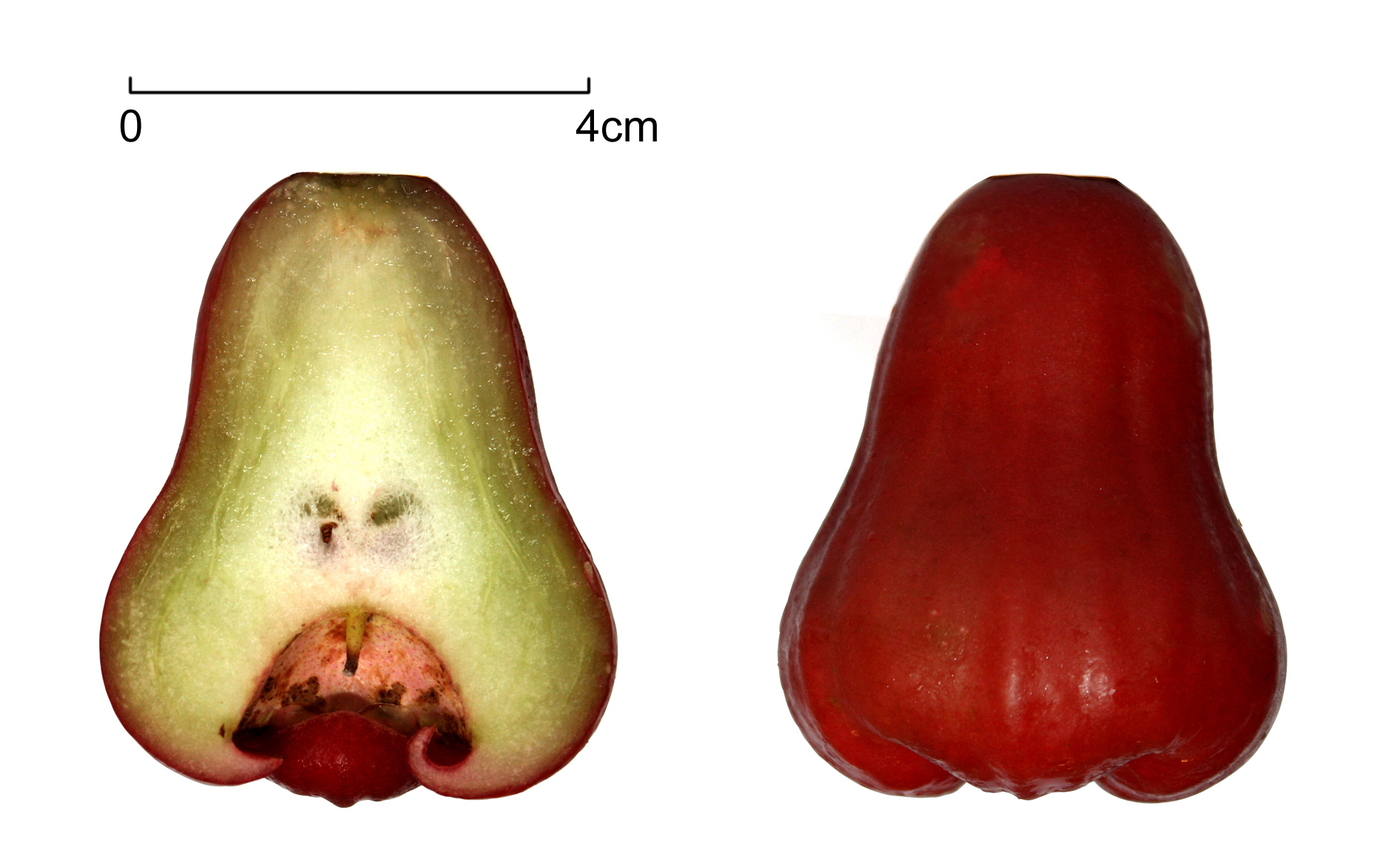
Syzygium samarangense, with a cross-section of the fruit

Historically, the Myrtaceae were divided into two subfamilies. Subfamily Myrtoideae (about 75 genera) was recognized as having fleshy fruits and opposite, entire leaves. Most genera in this subfamily have one of three easily recognized types of embryos. The genera of Myrtoideae can be very difficult to distinguish in the absence of mature fruits. Myrtoideae are found worldwide in subtropical and tropical regions, with centers of diversity in the Neotropics, northeastern Australia, and Malesia. In contrast, subfamily Leptospermoideae (about 80 genera) was recognized as having dry, dehiscent fruits (capsules) and leaves arranged spirally or alternate. The Leptospermoideae are found mostly in Australasia, with a centre of diversity in Australia. Many genera in Western Australia have greatly reduced leaves and flowers typical of dryer habitats.

== Taxonomy ==
The division of the Myrtaceae into Leptospermoideae and Myrtoideae was challenged by a number of authors, including Johnson and Briggs (1984), who identified 14 tribes or clades within Myrtaceae, and found Myrtoideae to be polyphyletic. Molecular studies by several groups of authors, as of 2008, have confirmed the baccate (fleshy) fruits evolved twice from capsular fruits and, as such, the two-subfamily classification does not accurately portray the phylogenetic history of the family. Thus, many workers are now using a recent analysis by Wilson et al. (2001) as a starting point for further analyses of the family. This study pronounced both Leptospermoideae and Myrtoideae invalid, but retained several smaller suballiances shown to be monophyletic through matK analysis.

The genera Heteropyxis and Psiloxylon have been separated as separate families by many authors in the past as Heteropyxidaceae and Psiloxylaceae. However, Wilson et al. included them in Myrtaceae. These two genera are presently believed to be the earliest arising and surviving lineages of Myrtaceae.

The most recent classification recognizes 17 tribes and two subfamilies, Myrtoideae and Psiloxyloideae, based on a phylogenetic analysis of plastid DNA.

Many new species are being described annually from throughout the range of Myrtaceae. Likewise, new genera are being described nearly yearly.

== Classification ==
Following Wilson (2011)

Subfamily Psiloxyloideae

- tribe Heteropyxideae
- tribe Psiloxyleae

Subfamily Myrtoideae

- tribe Backhousieae
- tribe Chamelaucieae
- tribe Eucalypteae
- tribe Kanieae
- tribe Leptospermeae
- tribe Lindsayomyrteae
- tribe Lophostemoneae
- tribe Melaleuceae
- tribe Metrosidereae
- tribe Myrteae
- tribe Osbornieae
- tribe Syncarpieae
- tribe Syzygieae
- tribe Tristanieae
- tribe Xanthostemoneae

== Genera ==
As of February 2025, Plants of the World Online accepts the following 130 genera:

- Acca O.Berg
- Accara Landrum
- Actinodium S.Schauer ex Schltdl.
- Aggreflorum Peter G.Wilson
- Agonis (DC.) Sweet
- Algrizea Proença & NicLugh.
- Allosyncarpia S.T.Blake
- Aluta Rye & Trudgen
- Amomyrtella Kausel
- Amomyrtus (Burret) D.Legrand & Kausel
- Angophora Cav.
- Anticoryne Turcz.
- Apectospermum Peter G.Wilson
- Archirhodomyrtus (Nied.) Burret
- Arillastrum Pancher ex Baill.
- Astartea DC.
- Asteromyrtus S.Schauer
- Astus Trudgen & Rye
- Austrobaeckea Rye
- Austromyrtus (Nied.) Burret
- Babingtonia Lindl.
- Backhousia Hook. & Harv.
- Baeckea L.
- Balaustion Hook.
- Barongia Peter G.Wilson & B.Hyland
- Basisperma C.T.White
- Blepharocalyx O.Berg
- Calycolpus O.Berg
- Calytrix Labill.
- Campomanesia Ruiz & Pav.
- Chamelaucium Desf.
- Chamguava Landrum
- Cheyniana Rye
- Cloezia Brongn. & Gris
- Corymbia K.D.Hill & L.A.S.Johnson
- Curitiba Salywon & Landrum
- Cyathostemon Turcz.
- Darwinia Rudge
- Decaspermum J.R.Forst. & G.Forst.
- Enekbatus Trudgen & Rye
- Ericomyrtus Turcz.
- Eucalyptopsis C.T.White
- Eucalyptus L'Hér.
- Eugenia P.Micheli ex L.
- Euryomyrtus S.Schauer
- Feijoa O.Berg
- Gaudium Peter G.Wilson
- Gossia N.Snow & Guymer
- Harmogia S.Schauer
- Heteropyxis Harv.
- Homalocalyx F.Muell.
- Homalospermum S.Schauer
- Homoranthus A.Cunn. ex Schauer
- Hypocalymma (Endl.) Endl.
- Hysterobaeckea (Nied.) Rye
- Kanakomyrtus N.Snow
- Kania Schltr.
- Kardomia Peter G.Wilson
- Kjellbergiodendron Burret
- Kunzea Rchb.
- Legrandia Kausel
- Lenwebbia N.Snow & Guymer
- Leptospermopsis S.Moore
- Leptospermum J.R.Forst. & G.Forst.
- Lindsayomyrtus B.Hyland & Steenis
- Lithomyrtus F.Muell.
- Lophomyrtus Burret
- Lophostemon Schott
- Luma A.Gray
- Lysicarpus F.Muell.
- Malleostemon J.W.Green
- Melaleuca L.
- Metrosideros Banks ex Gaertn.
- Micromyrtus Benth.
- Mitrantia Peter G.Wilson & B.Hyland
- Mosiera Small
- Myrceugenia O.Berg
- Myrcia DC. ex Guill.
- Myrcianthes O.Berg
- Myrciaria O.Berg
- Myrrhinium Schott
- Myrtastrum Burret
- Myrtella F.Muell.
- Myrteola O.Berg
- Myrtus Tourn. ex L.
- Neofabricia Joy Thomps.
- Neomitranthes D.Legrand
- Neomyrtus Burret
- Nothomyrcia Kausel
- Ochrosperma Trudgen
- Octamyrtus Diels
- Osbornia F.Muell.
- Oxymyrrhine S.Schauer
- Pericalymma (Endl.) Endl.
- Pileanthus Labill.
- Pilidiostigma Burret
- Pimenta Lindl.
- Pleurocalyptus Brongn. & Gris
- Plinia Plum. ex L.
- Psidium L.
- Psiloxylon Thouars ex Tul.
- Purpureostemon Gugerli
- Rhodamnia Jack
- Rhodomyrtus (DC.) Rchb.
- Rinzia S.Schauer
- Ristantia Peter G.Wilson & J.T.Waterh.
- Sannantha Peter G.Wilson
- Scholtzia S.Schauer
- Seorsus Rye & Trudgen
- Siphoneugena O.Berg
- Sphaerantia Peter G.Wilson & B.Hyland
- Stenostegia A.R.Bean
- Stockwellia D.J.Carr, S.G.M.Carr & B.Hyland
- Syncarpia Ten.
- Syzygium Gaertn.
- Taxandria (Benth.) J.R.Wheeler & N.G.Marchant
- Temu O.Berg
- Tetrapora S.Schauer
- Thaleropia Peter G.Wilson
- Thryptomene Endl.
- Triplarina Raf.
- Tristania R.Br.
- Tristaniopsis Brongn. & Gris
- Ugni Turcz.
- Uromyrtus Burret
- Verticordia DC.
- Welchiodendron Peter G.Wilson & J.T.Waterh.
- Whiteodendron Steenis
- Xanthomyrtus Diels
- Xanthostemon F.Muell.

== Ecology ==
Myrtaceae is foraged by many stingless bees, especially by species such as Melipona bicolor which gather pollen from this plant family. Some Australian species such as Tetragonula hockingsi and T. carbonaria are also known to collect resin from the mature seed pods of Corymbia torelliana, resulting in mellitochory as the seeds get stuck onto the corbiculae of the bees and sometimes are successfully disposed of by colony members that remove them. But usually, they get stuck in the hives or near hive entrances instead, hence also making it a minor nuisance for some keepers as they can take up a lot of space. Fortunately, this is only known to occur in the eastern areas of Australia, but could occur in other neighbouring countries where some Corymbia species are native.

Weevils in the tribe Cryptoplini mostly use Myrtaceae as hosts. Their larvae can develop in flower and fruit buds, or in galls (often galls already formed by other insects).
