= Darwinia salina =

Scientific classification
- Kingdom: Plantae
- Clade: Tracheophytes
- Clade: Angiosperms
- Clade: Eudicots
- Clade: Rosids
- Order: Myrtales
- Family: Myrtaceae
- Genus: Darwinia
- Species: D. salina

Binomial name
- Darwinia salina Craven & S.R.Jones
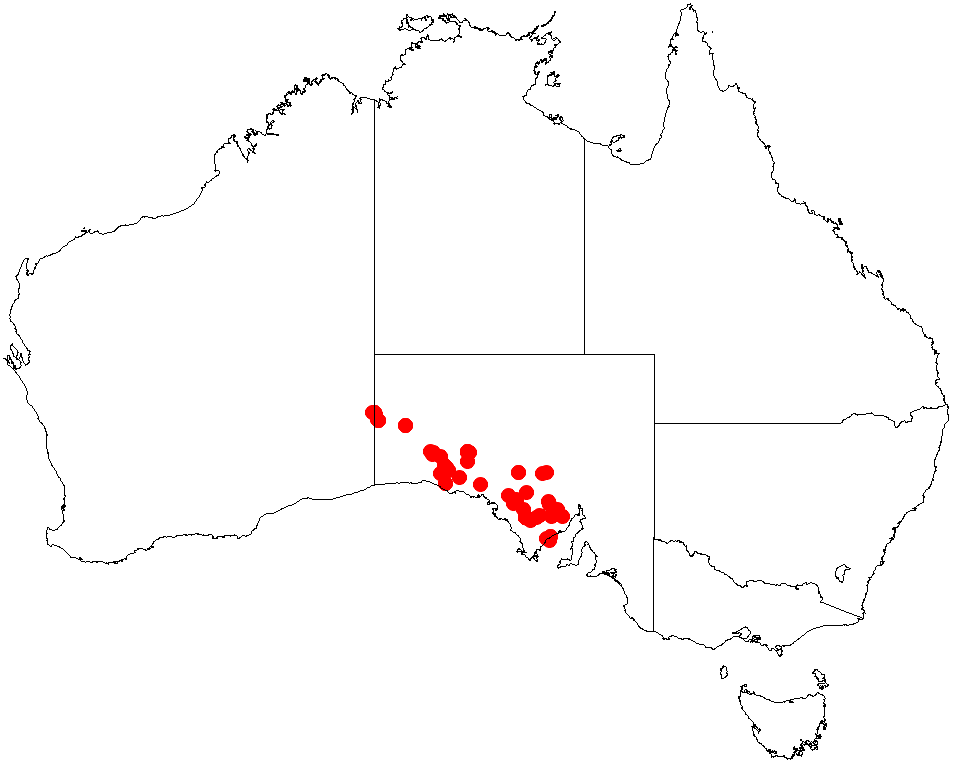
- Range

Species of plant

Darwinia salina is a small shrub in the myrtle family. It is native to South Australia.
