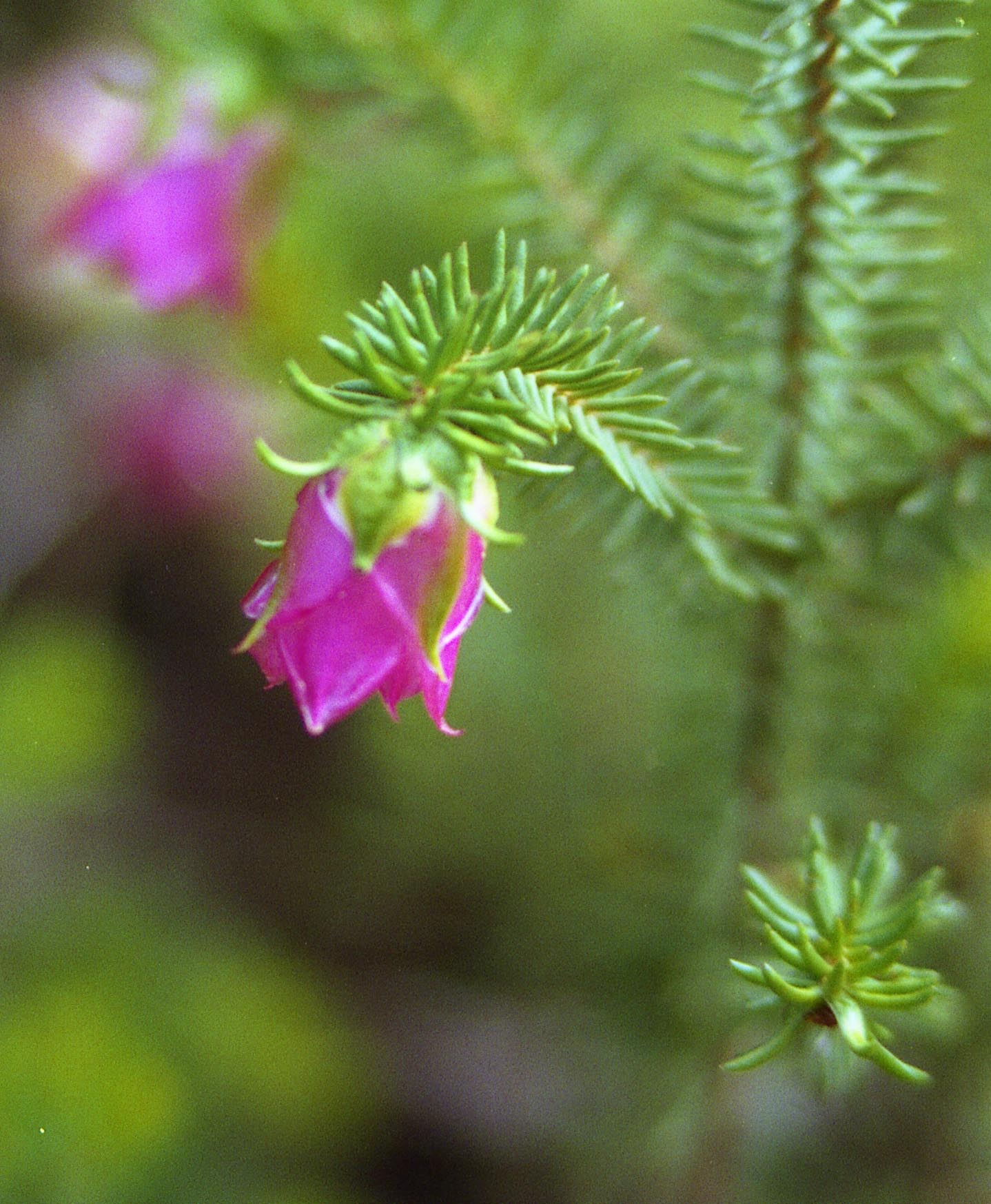
- Darwinia leiostyla

Scientific classification
- Kingdom: Plantae
- Clade: Tracheophytes
- Clade: Angiosperms
- Clade: Eudicots
- Clade: Rosids
- Order: Myrtales
- Family: Myrtaceae
- Subfamily: Myrtoideae
- Tribe: Chamelaucieae
- Genus: Darwinia; Rudge

Species
- See text

Synonyms
- List: Cryptostemon F.Muell. & Miq.; Darwinia Rudge sect. Darwinia; Darwinia sect. Genetyllis (DC.) Benth. & Hook.f. nom. superfl.; Darwinia sect. Genetyllis (DC.) Benth.; Darwinia sect. Hedaroma (Lindl.) Benth.; Darwynia Rchb. orth. var.; Francisia Endl.; Genethyllis F.Muell. orth. var.; Genetyllis DC. nom. inval., nom. nud.; Genetyllis DC.; Hedaroma Lindl.; Hederoma H.J.Veitch orth. var.; Polyzone Endl.

= Darwinia (plant) =

Genus of flowering plants

Darwinia, sometimes commonly known as mountain bells or simply bells, is a genus of about 70 species of evergreen shrubs in the family Myrtaceae, endemic to southeastern and southwestern Australia. The majority are native to southern Western Australia, but a few species occur in South Australia, New South Wales and Victoria. The genus was named in honour of Erasmus Darwin, grandfather of Charles Darwin by Edward Rudge in 1816. Most darwinias grow to a height of between 0.2 and 3 m (0.7 and 10 ft), and many are prostrate shrubs. Most have small, simple leaves and the flowers are often grouped together, each flower with five red, white or greenish petals and ten stamens. In many species, the flowers are surrounded by large, colourful bracts, giving rise to their common names.

== Description ==
Darwinia species are prostrate to erect, woody shrubs growing to a height of 0.2 and 3 m (0.7 and 10 ft). The leaves are usually arranged in opposite pairs and are simple, small, needle-like to oval and contain essential oils. The flowers are arranged near the ends of the branches and are usually surrounded by leaf-like green bracts and larger, usually coloured bracteoles. The flowers have five, usually very small sepals and 5 petals which enclose the stamens and may be white or coloured. There are 10 stamens which alternate with 10 staminodes, all of which are enclosed by the petals so that they are not visible in an intact flower. The style projects beyond the flower and has a groups of hairs near the stigma. The fruit is a non-fleshy nut which retains the (usually one) seed at maturity.

== Taxonomy and naming ==
The genus Darwinia was first formally described by Edward Rudge in 1816 and the type species is Darwinia fascicularis. Rudge published his description in Transactions of the Linnean Society of London. There are about 70 species but many have not been formally described. George Bentham undertook a review of the genus in 1865 when he described 23 species in Flora Australiensis (although the species he named Darwinia verticordina is now known as Verticordia verticordina). The genus was named for Erasmus Darwin.

About 30 species of Darwinia have been discovered but not yet formally described. They have been given informal names such as Darwinia sp. Bindoon and Darwinia sp. Canna.

== Distribution ==
Darwinias are found in New South Wales, Victoria, South Australia and Western Australia. Sixty of the roughly 70 species occur in Western Australia and 11 grow naturally in New South Wales.

== Ecology ==
Land clearing and grazing practices have reduced the areas where Darwinia species grow naturally. Recovery is hindered by drought, changed fire regimes and susceptibility of some species, especially Gillam's Bell (Darwinia oxylepis) to infection by the oomycete, Phytophthora cinnamomi.

== Conservation ==
Some species in the genus Darwinia are threatened with extinction, being listed as Endangered or Vulnerable on the Australian National List of Threatened Flora. These include the Yellow Mountain Bell (Darwinia collina), Gillam's Bell (Darwinia oxylepis) and Abba Bell (Darwinia whicherensis).

== Use in horticulture ==
Darwinias are difficult to propagate from seed but can be cultivated from cuttings.

== List of species ==
The following is a list of Darwinia species accepted by the Australian Plant Census as at December 2020:

- Darwinia acerosa W.Fitzg. – fine-leaved darwinia (W.A.)
- Darwinia apiculata N.G.Marchant – scarp darwinia (W.A.)
- Darwinia biflora (Cheel) B.G.Briggs (N.S.W.)
- Darwinia briggsiae Craven & S.R.Jones (N.S.W.)
- Darwinia camptostylis B.G.Briggs (N.S.W., Vic.)
- Darwinia capitellata Rye (W.A.)
- Darwinia carnea C.A.Gardner – Mogumber bell, Narrogin bell (W.A.)
- Darwinia chapmaniana Keighery – Chapman's bell, Eganu bell (W.A.)
- Darwinia citriodora (Endl.) Benth. – lemon-scented darwinia, lemon-scented myrtle (W.A.)
- Darwinia collina C.A.Gardner – yellow mountain bell (W.A.)
- Darwinia diminuta B.G.Briggs (N.S.W.)
- Darwinia diosmoides (DC.) Benth. (W.A.)
- Darwinia divisa Keighery & N.G.Marchant (W.A.)
- Darwinia fascicularis Rudge (N.S.W.)
- Darwinia ferricola Keighery – Scott River darwinia (W.A.)
- Darwinia foetida Keighery – Muchea bell (W.A.)
- Darwinia glaucophylla B.G.Briggs (N.S.W.)
- Darwinia grandiflora R.T.Baker & H.G.Sm. (N.S.W.)
- Darwinia helichrysoides (Meisn.) Benth. (W.A.)
- Darwinia hortiorum K.R.Thiele (W.A.)
- Darwinia hypericifolia (Turcz.) Domin (W.A.)
- Darwinia leiostyla (Turcz.) Domin (W.A.)
- Darwinia leptantha B.G.Briggs (N.S.W.)
- Darwinia luehmannii F.Muell. & Tate (W.A.)
- Darwinia macrostegia (Turcz.) Benth. – Mondurup bell (W.A.)
- Darwinia masonii C.A.Gardner – Mason's darwinia (W.A.)
- Darwinia meeboldii C.A.Gardner – Cranbrook bell (W.A.)
- Darwinia micropetala (F.Muell.) Benth. – small darwinia (Vic., S.A.)
- Darwinia neildiana F.Muell. – fringed bell (W.A.)
- Darwinia nubigena Keighery – success bell, red mountain bell (W.A.)
- Darwinia oederoides (Turcz.) Benth. (W.A.)
- Darwinia oldfieldii Benth. – Oldfield's darwinia (W.A.)
- Darwinia oxylepis (Turcz.) N.G.Marchant & Keighery – Gillam's bell (W.A.)
- Darwinia pauciflora Benth. (W.A.)
- Darwinia peduncularis B.G.Briggs (N.S.W.)
- Darwinia pimelioides Cayzer & F.W.Wakef. (W.A.)
- Darwinia pinifolia (Lindl.) Benth. (W.A.)
- Darwinia polycephala C.A.Gardner (W.A.)
- Darwinia polychroma Keighery – harlequin bell (W.A.)
- Darwinia procera B.G.Briggs (N.S.W.)
- Darwinia purpurea (Endl.) Benth. – rose darwinia (W.A.)
- Darwinia salina Craven & S.R.Jones (S.A.)
- Darwinia sanguinea (Meisn.) Benth. (W.A.)
- Darwinia speciosa (Meisn.) Benth. (W.A.)
- Darwinia squarrosa (Turcz.) Domin – fringed mountain bell, pink mountain bell (W.A.)
- Darwinia taxifolia A.Cunn. (N.S.W.)
- Darwinia terricola Keighery – Blackwood bell (W.A.)
- Darwinia thymoides (Lindl.) Benth. (W.A.)
- Darwinia vestita (Endl.) Benth. – pom-pom darwinia (W.A.)
- Darwinia virescens (Meisn.) Benth. – Murchison darwinia (W.A.)
- Darwinia whicherensis Keighery – Abba bell (W.A.)
- Darwinia wittwerorum N.G.Marchant & Keighery – Wittwer's darwinia (W.A.)

=== Gallery ===
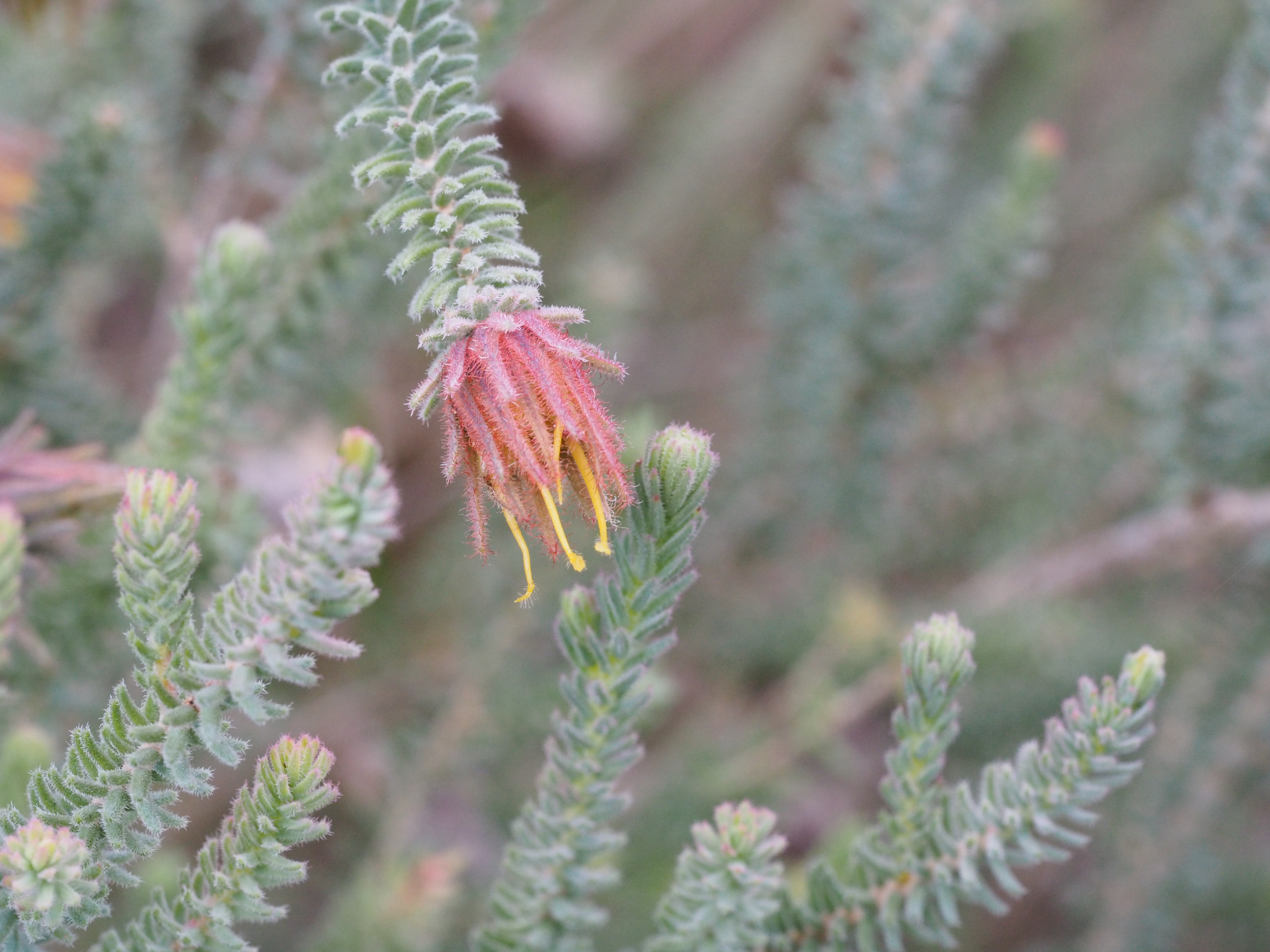
Darwinia chapmaniana in Kings Park

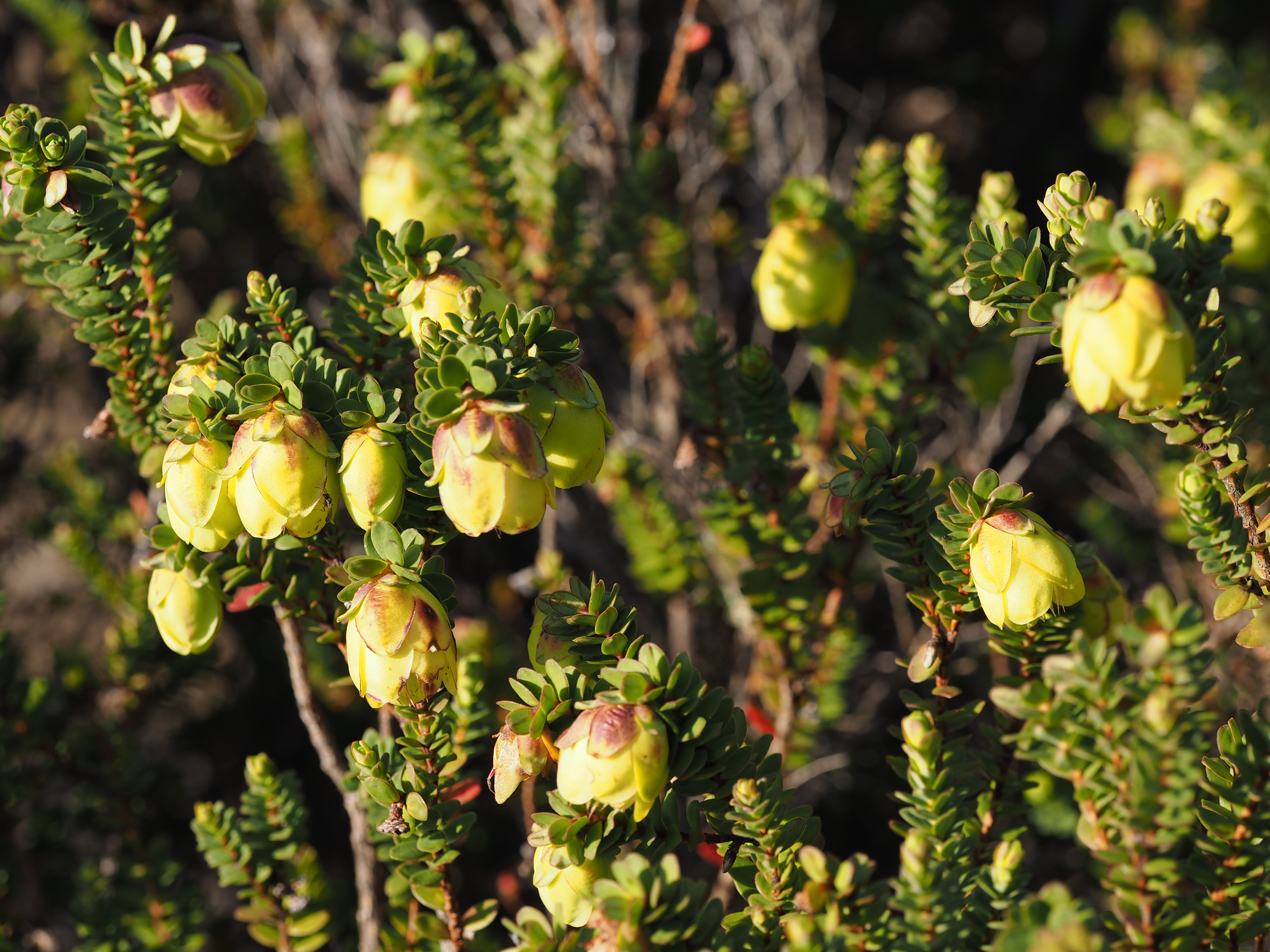
Darwinia collina on Bluff Knoll

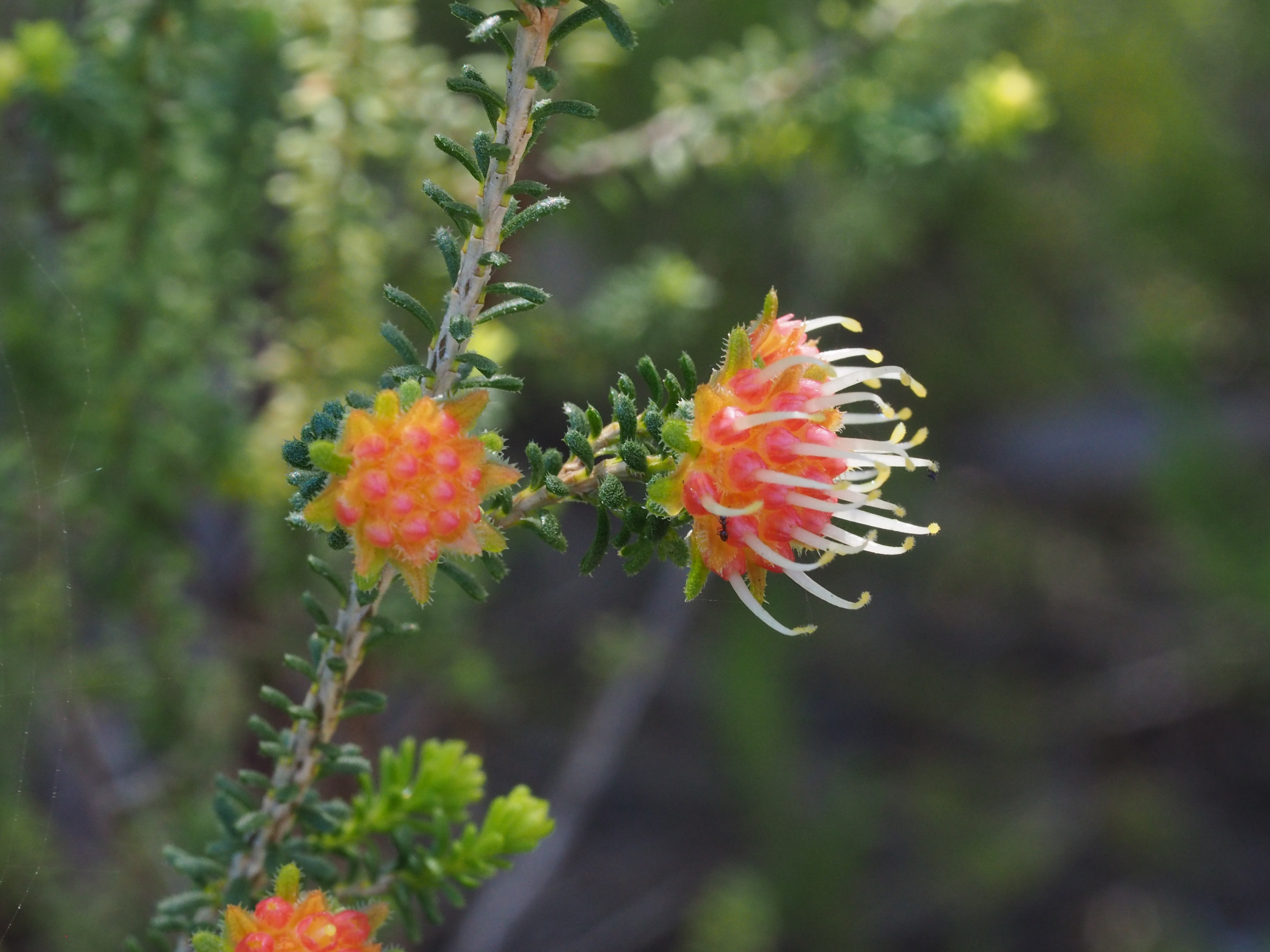
Darwinia sp. Mt Burdett in Kings Park

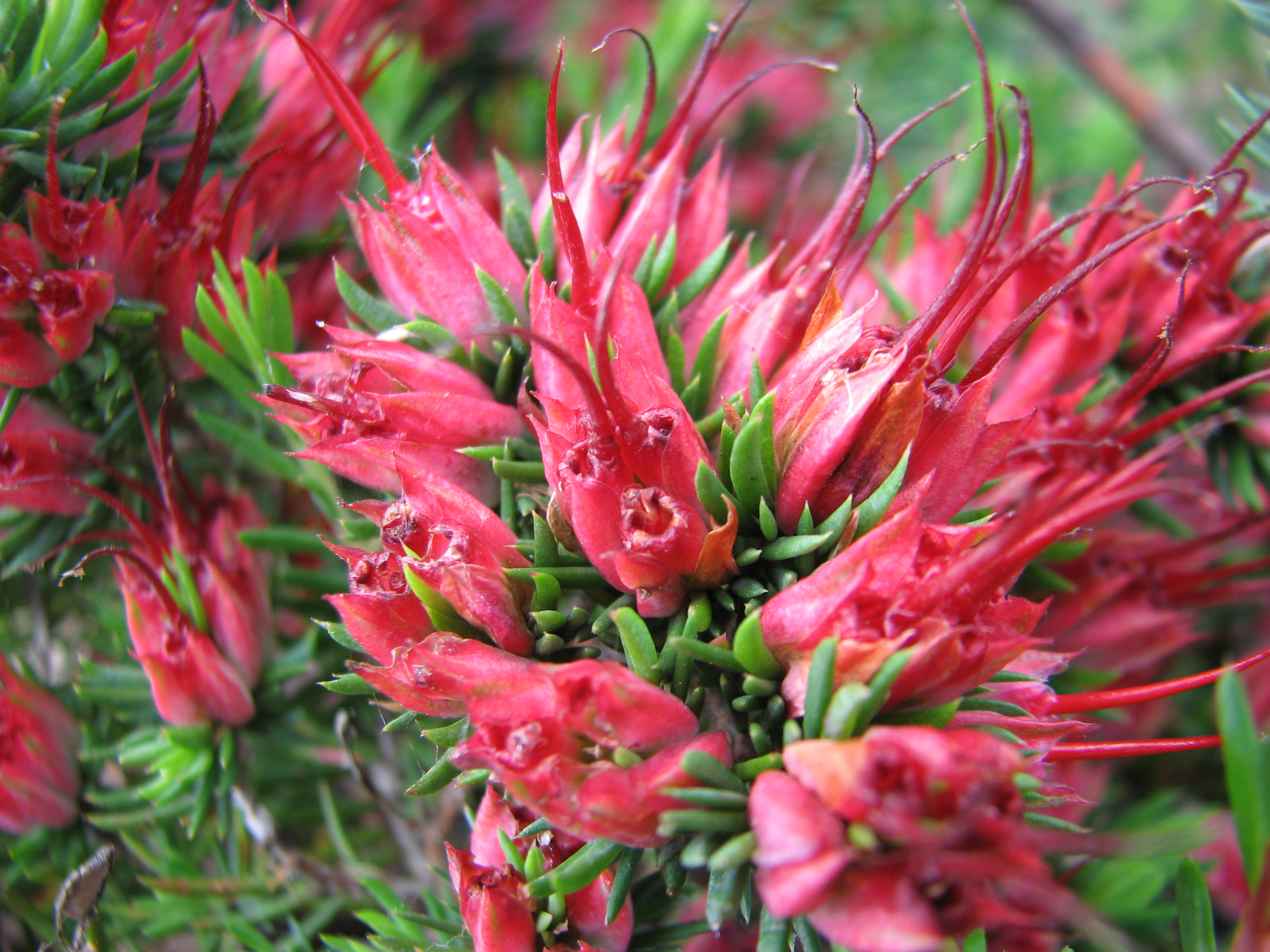
Darwinia grandiflora in Royal Botanic Gardens, Cranbourne

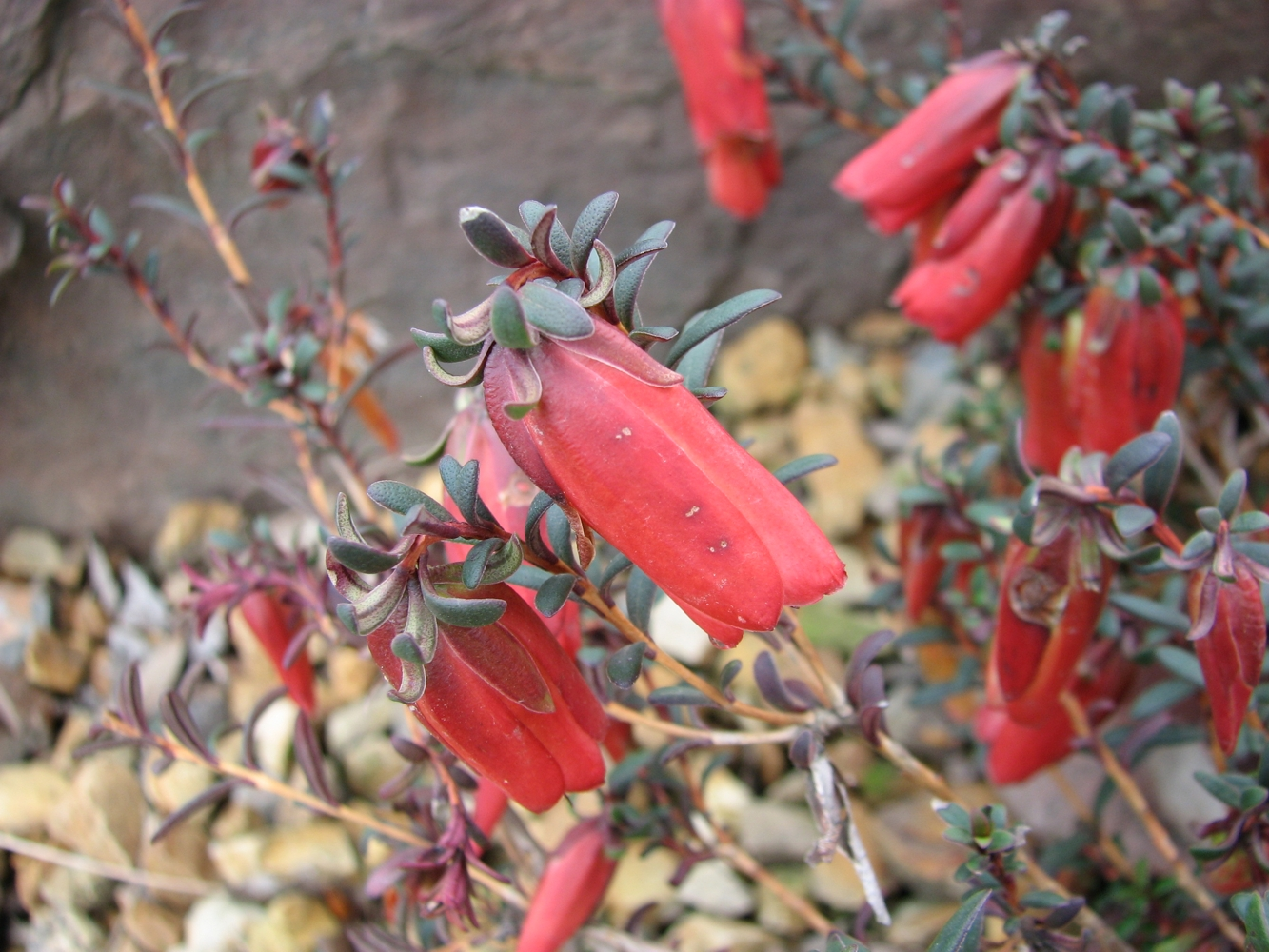
Darwinia hypericifolia in Royal Botanic Gardens, Cranbourne

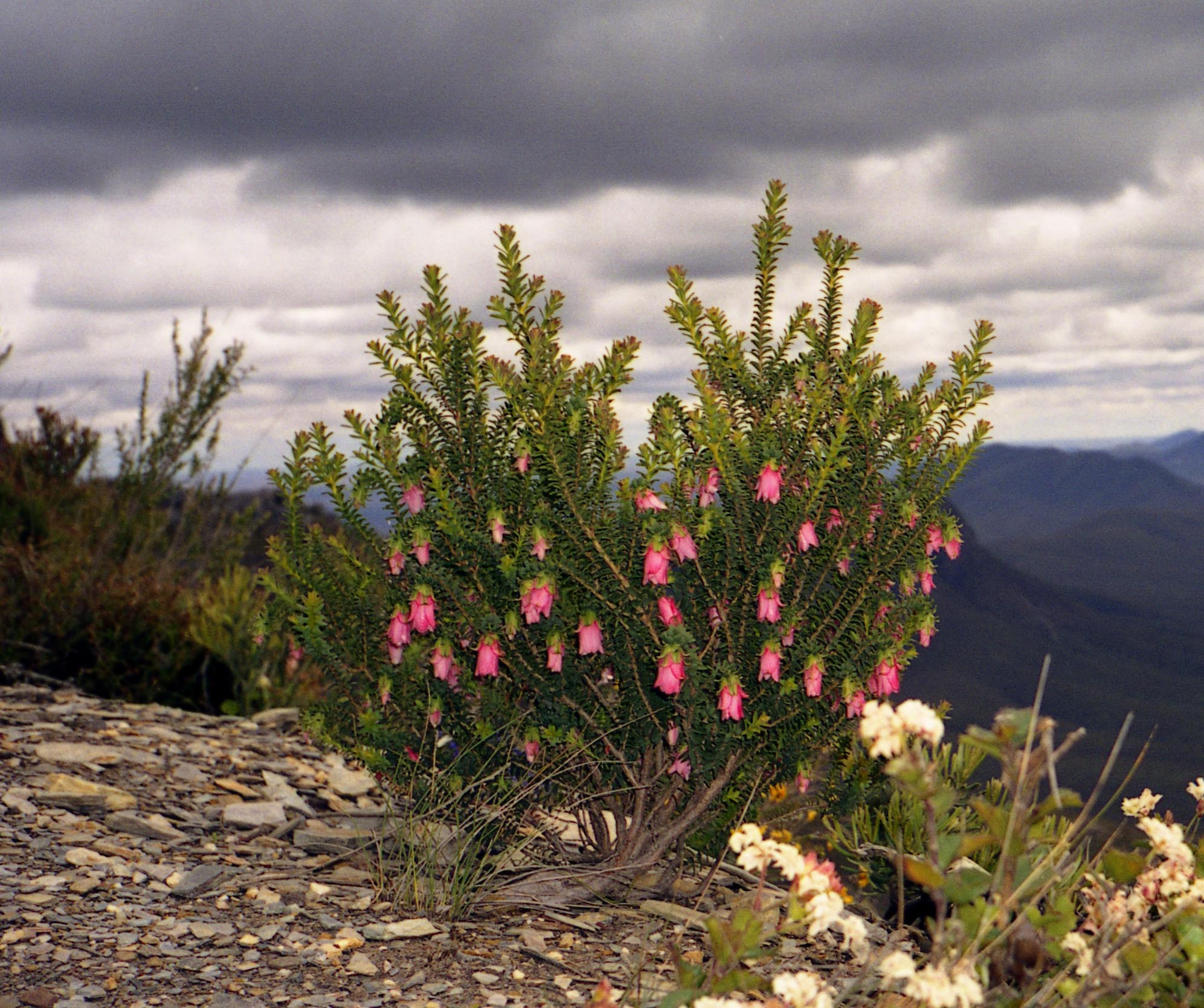
Darwinia leiostyla in the Stirling Range, Western Australia

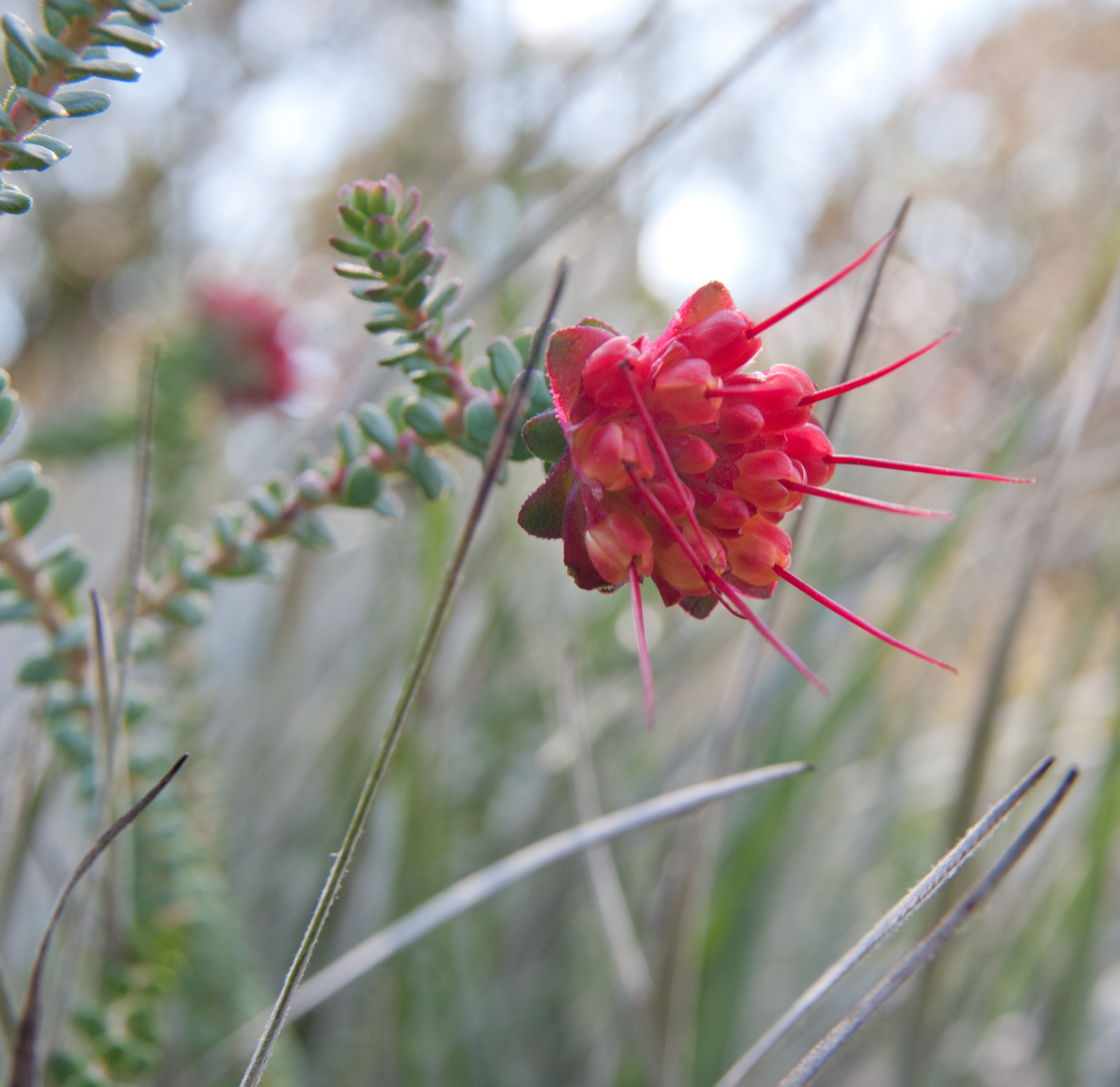
Darwinia oldfieldii

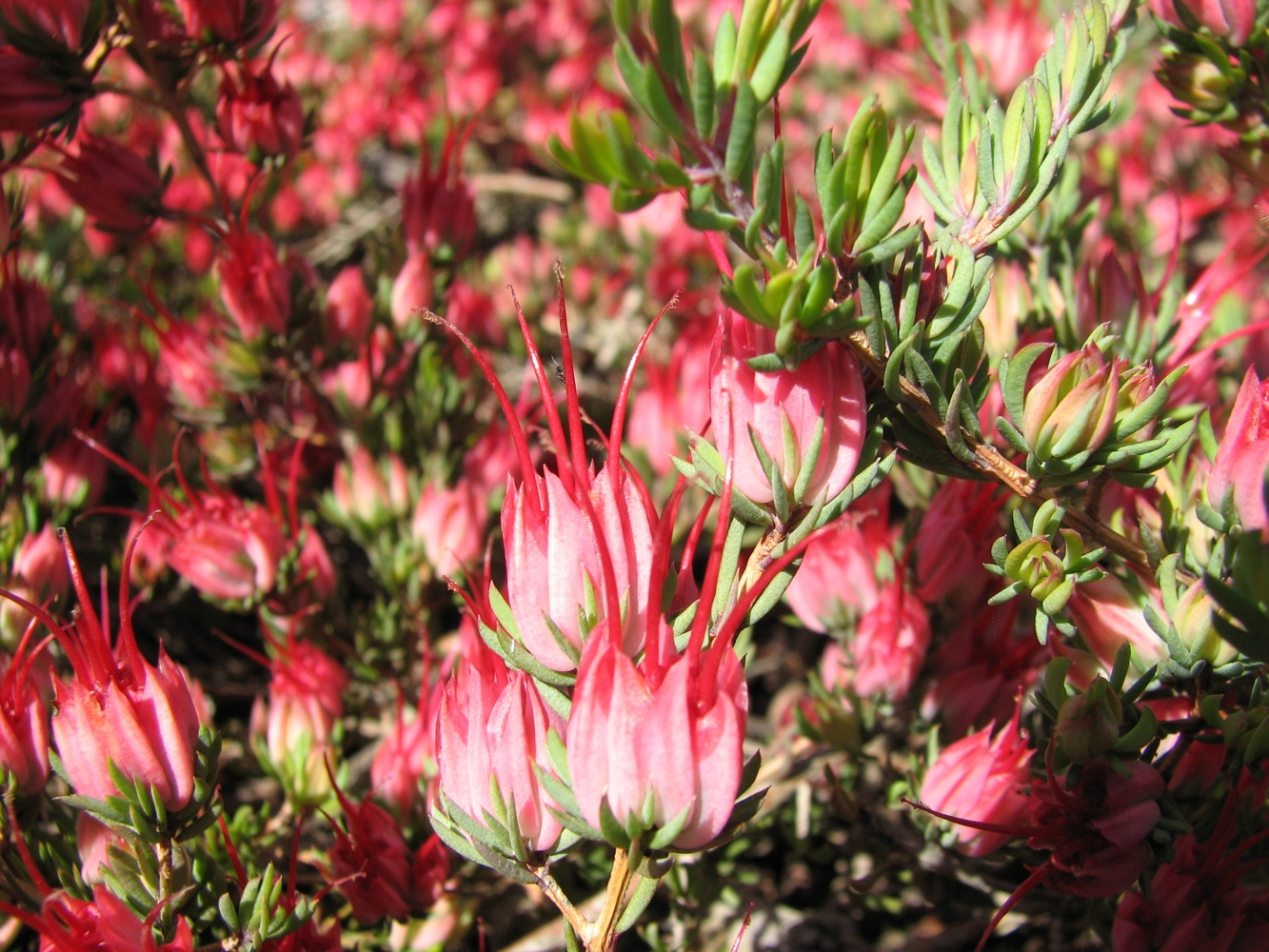
Darwinia taxifolia subsp. macrolaena in Royal Botanic Gardens, Cranbourne

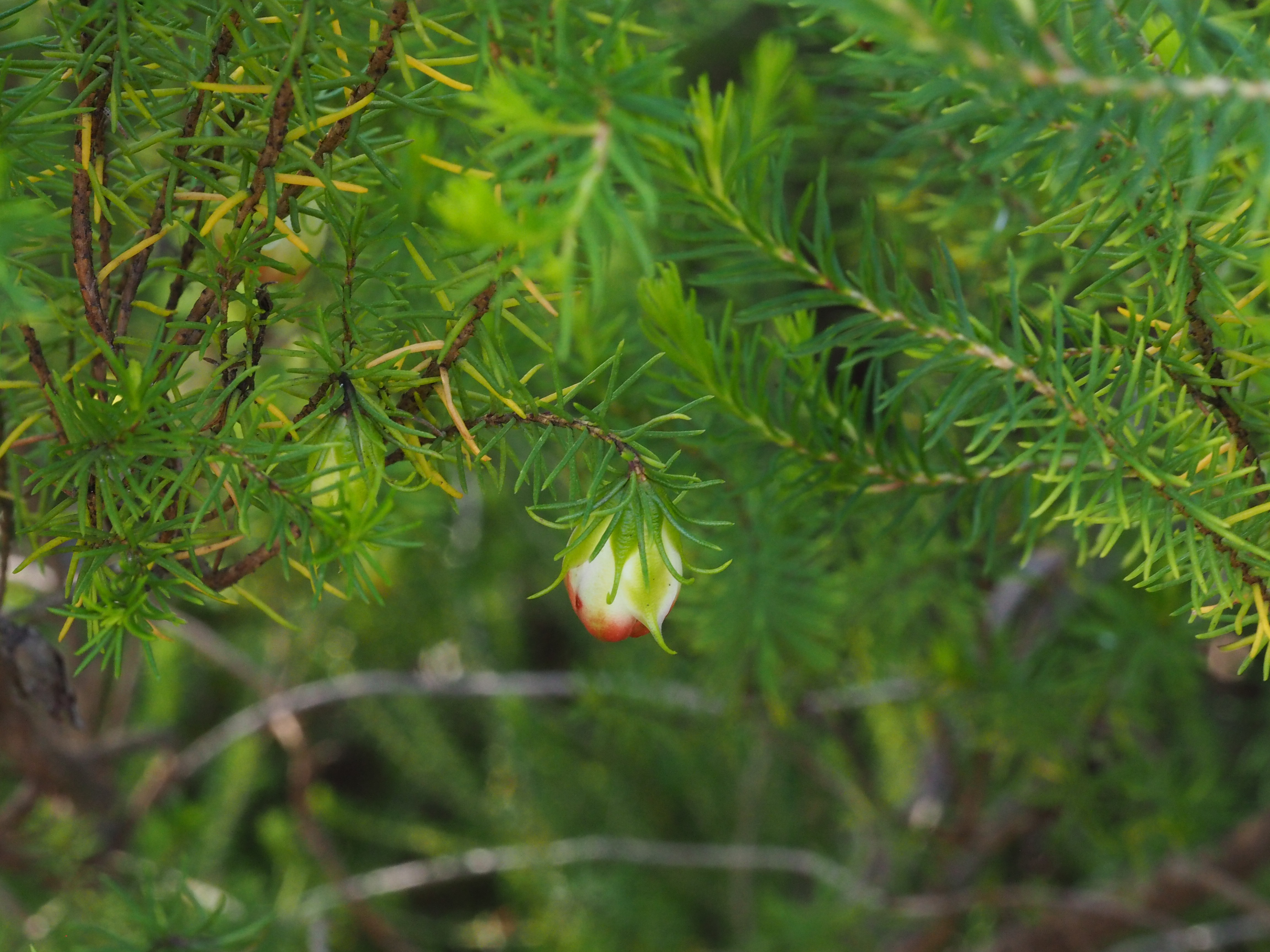
Darwinia wittwerorum in Kings Park, Perth
