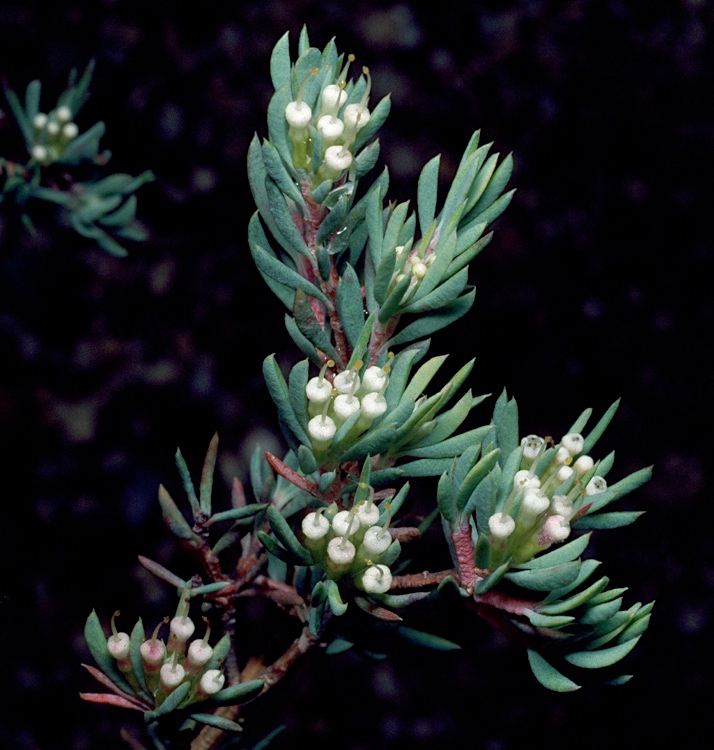

Scientific classification
- Kingdom: Plantae
- Clade: Tracheophytes
- Clade: Angiosperms
- Clade: Eudicots
- Clade: Rosids
- Order: Myrtales
- Family: Myrtaceae
- Genus: Darwinia
- Species: D. leptantha

Binomial name
- Darwinia leptantha B.G.Briggs

= Darwinia leptantha =

Species of flowering plant

Darwinia leptantha is a flowering plant in the family Myrtaceae. It is an upright, small shrub with white flowers turning pink with age, triangular-shaped leaves and is endemic to New South Wales.

== Description ==
Darwinia leptantha is an upright shrub 20–80 cm (7.9–31.5 in) high with smooth, flattened leaves 7–11 mm (0.28–0.43 in) long. The slender tubular flowers are borne at the end of short erect stems in tight clusters of 2-8, 4–6 mm (0.16–0.24 in) long, about 0.5 mm (0.020 in) in diameter, petals 0.5–1 mm (0.020–0.039 in) long, white when young turning pink with age and on a peduncle 1–2 mm (0.039–0.079 in) long. The bracts are leaf-like 1–11 mm (0.039–0.433 in) long, bracteoles reddish to yellowish brown, 2–3.5 mm (0.079–0.138 in) long, style white, straight or curved and 4–6.5 mm (0.16–0.26 in) long. Flowering occurs from late autumn to spring.

== Taxonomy and naming ==
Darwinia leptantha was first formally described in 1962 by Barbara Gillian Briggs and the description was published in Contributions from the New South Wales National Herbarium. The specific epithet (leptantha) means "slender flowered".

== Distribution and habitat ==
This darwinia grows in coastal heath and sandy soils on the coast and ranges from Laurieton to the Clyde River of eastern New South Wales.
