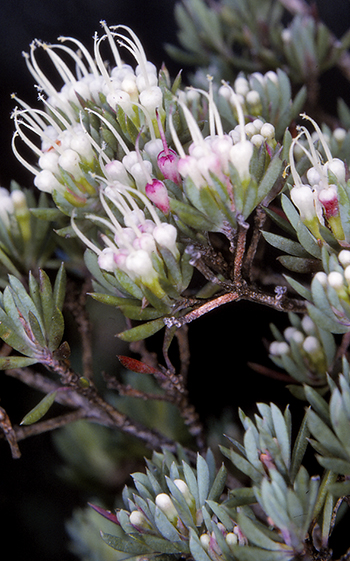
- In Booderee National Park

Scientific classification
- Kingdom: Plantae
- Clade: Tracheophytes
- Clade: Angiosperms
- Clade: Eudicots
- Clade: Rosids
- Order: Myrtales
- Family: Myrtaceae
- Genus: Darwinia
- Species: D. camptostylis

Binomial name
- Darwinia camptostylis B.G.Briggs

= Darwinia camptostylis =

Species of flowering plant

Darwinia camptostylis is a plant in the myrtle family Myrtaceae and is endemic to New South Wales and Victoria. It is small shrub with flattened, glabrous leaves and small clusters of green to yellow flowers. There are scattered populations in coastal areas where the plants grow in heath.

== Description ==
Darwinia camptostylis is a densely-foliaged, erect or spreading shrub which grows to a height of less than 30 centimetres (10 in). The leaves are crowded near the ends of the branches and are flattened or triangular in cross section. They are 6–12 millimetres (0.2–0.5 in) long and less than 1 millimetre (0.04 in).

The flowers are clustered near the ends of the branches in groups of two to four pairs, on stalks less than 1 millimetre (0.04 in) long, . When they open, the flowers are tubular in shape, surrounded by leaf-like bracts and two lance-shaped, yellowish-green bracteoles which fall off as the flowers mature. The bracteoles are 3.5–6 millimetres (0.1–0.2 in) and surround the floral cup which is 3.5–6 millimetres (0.1–0.2 in) long, white and sometimes has a red tip. The petals are egg-shaped, about 2 millimetres (0.08 in) long and surround the stamens and the base of the style. The style is white, curved and 2.5–5 millimetres (0.1–0.2 in) long. Flowering usually occurs between August and November and is followed by the fruit which is a small, non-fleshy nut.

== Taxonomy ==
The first formal description of Darwinia camptostylis was by Barbara Briggs and the description was published in 1962 in Contributions from the New South Wales National Herbarium.

== Distribution and habitat ==
This darwinia occurs in coastal areas of southern New South Wales and far eastern Victoria where it grows in heath or heathy woodland.

== Conservation ==
Darwinia camptostylis is classified as rare in Victoria.
