= Darwinia polycephala =

Conservation status
- Priority Four — Rare Taxa (DEC)

Scientific classification
- Kingdom: Plantae
- Clade: Tracheophytes
- Clade: Angiosperms
- Clade: Eudicots
- Clade: Rosids
- Order: Myrtales
- Family: Myrtaceae
- Genus: Darwinia
- Species: D. polycephala

Binomial name
- Darwinia polycephala C.A.Gardner
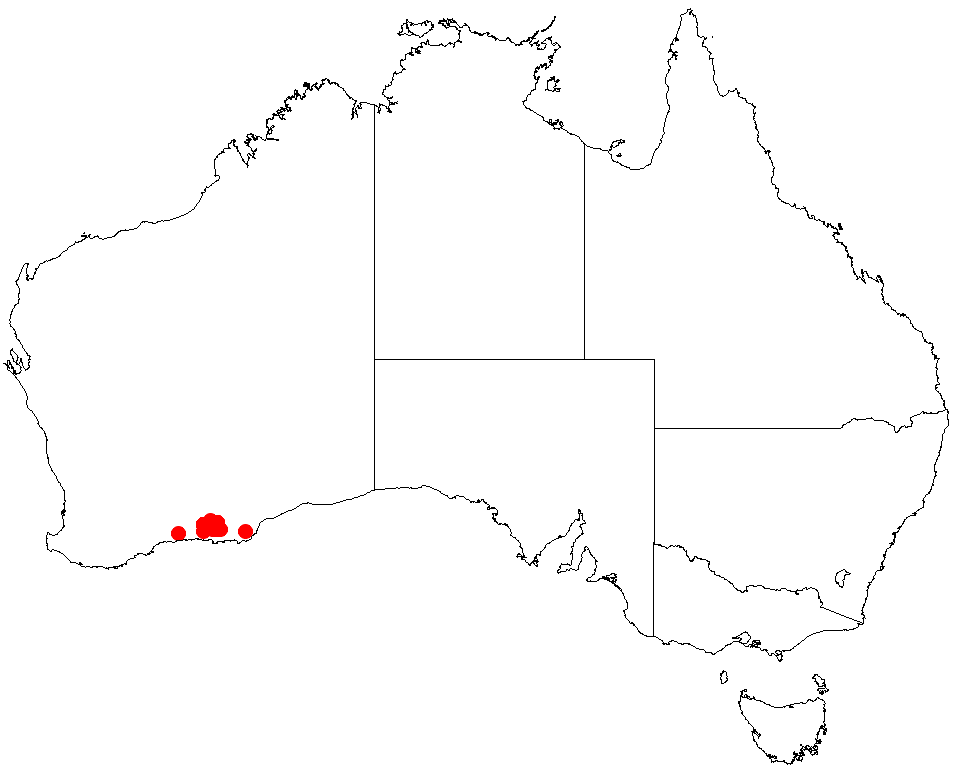
- Occurrence data from AVH

Species of flowering plant

Darwinia polycephala is a plant in the myrtle family Myrtaceae and is endemic to Western Australia. It is a diffuse shrub that typically grows to a height of 10–50 cm (3.9–19.7 in) and produces red to purple flowers between March and September.

Darwinia polycephala was first formally described in 1924 by Charles Gardner in the Journal of the Royal Society of Western Australia. The specific epithet (polycephala) means "many-headed".

This darwinia is often found on flat areas and around the margins of salt lakes in the Mallee bioregion of southern Western Australia. It is listed as "Priority Four" by the Government of Western Australia Department of Biodiversity, Conservation and Attractions, meaning that it is rare or near threatened.
