= Darwinia divisa =

Conservation status
- Declared Rare — Presumed Extinct (DEC)

Scientific classification
- Kingdom: Plantae
- Clade: Tracheophytes
- Clade: Angiosperms
- Clade: Eudicots
- Clade: Rosids
- Order: Myrtales
- Family: Myrtaceae
- Genus: Darwinia
- Species: D. divisa

Binomial name
- Darwinia divisa Keighery & N.G.Marchant

Species of plant

Darwinia divisa is a species of flowering plant in the myrtle family Myrtaceae and is endemic to a restricted part of the south-west of Western Australia. It is a slender, erect shrub with white flowers and is the only species of its genus with "divided prominent calyx lobes" and a hairy calyx tube.

It was first formally described in 2002 by Greg Keighery and Neville Marchant in the Nordic Journal of Botany from specimens collected by Fred Lullfitz near Bendering in 1965.

Darwinia divisa is presumed extinct by the Government of Western Australia Department of Biodiversity, Conservation and Attractions, not having been collected for more than 50 years, despite extensive surveys at the type location and surrounding remnants during 1997-2000.
