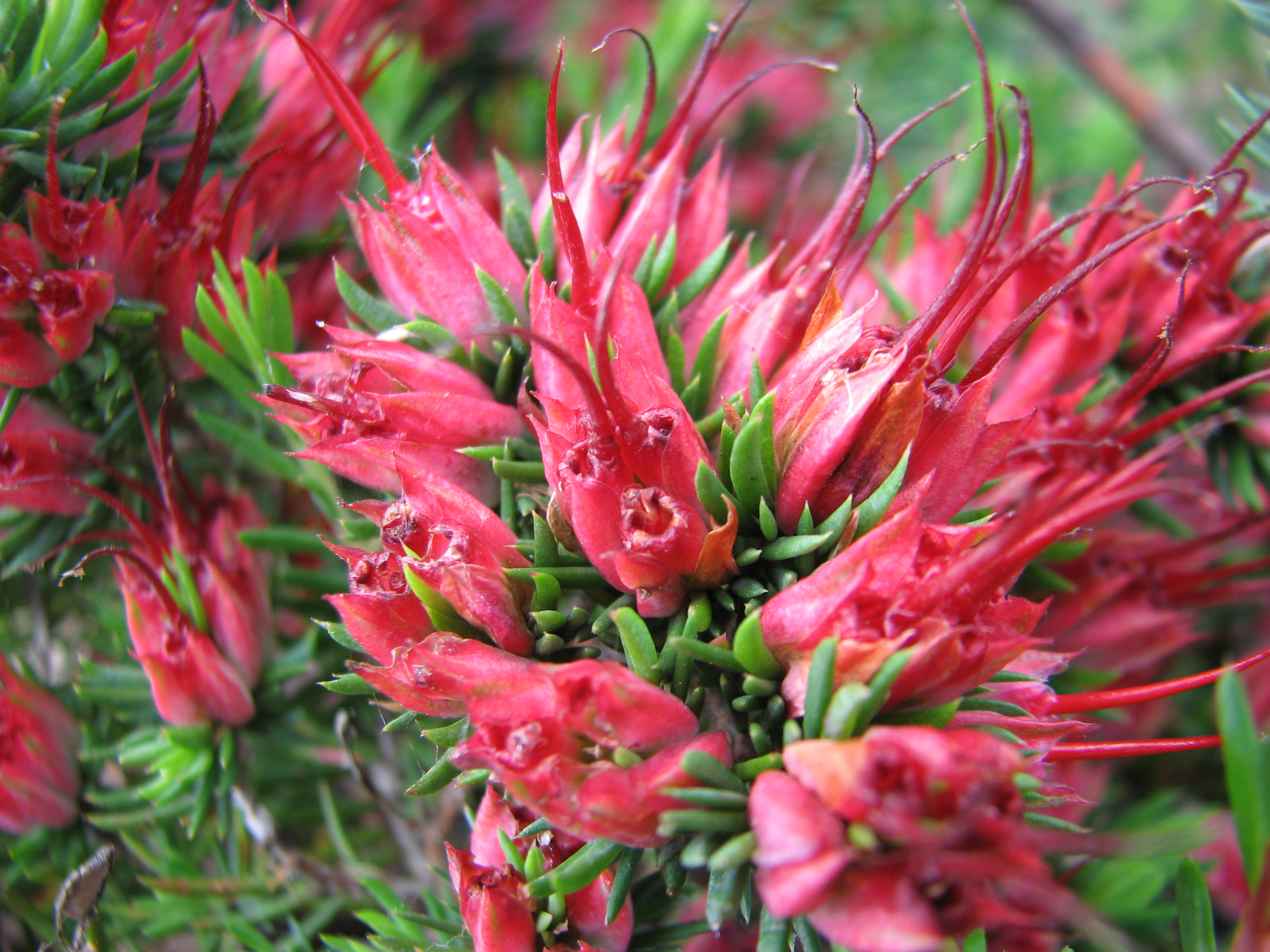

Scientific classification
- Kingdom: Plantae
- Clade: Tracheophytes
- Clade: Angiosperms
- Clade: Eudicots
- Clade: Rosids
- Order: Myrtales
- Family: Myrtaceae
- Genus: Darwinia
- Species: D. grandiflora

Binomial name
- Darwinia grandiflora R.T.Baker & H.G.Sm.
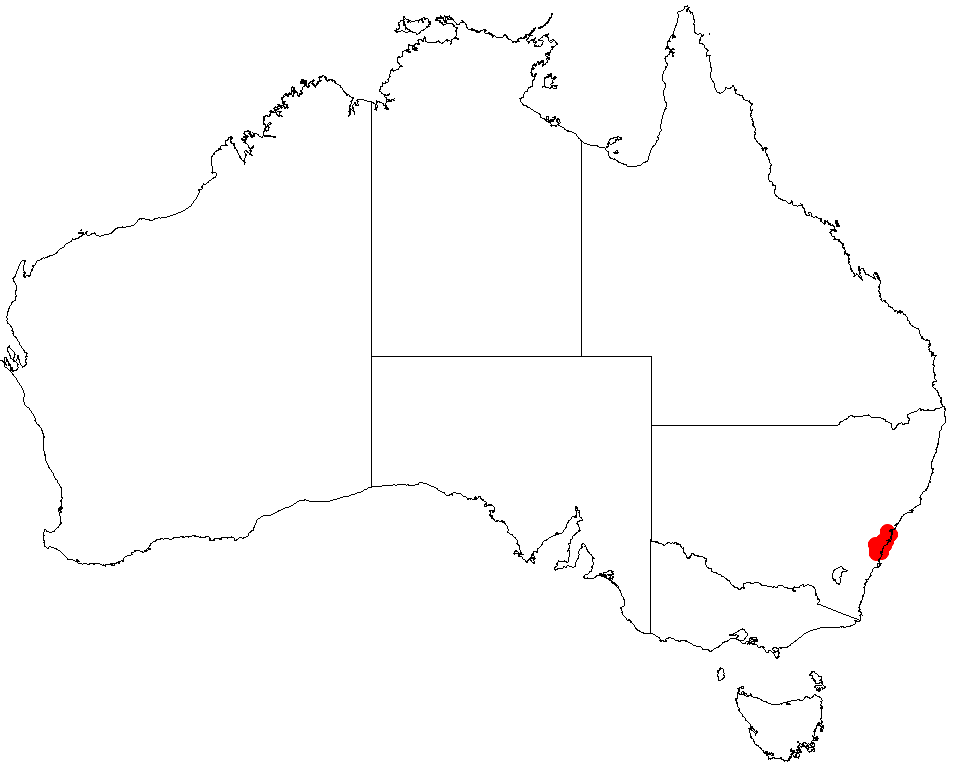

= Darwinia grandiflora =

Species of flowering plant

Darwinia grandiflora is a flowering plant in the family Myrtaceae. It is a dense, mat forming, prostrate shrub with clusters of tubular red flowers and is endemic to New South Wales.

== Description ==
Darwinia grandiflora is a prostrate, mat forming, dense shrub up to 50 cm (20 in) high and stems up to 2.5 m (8 ft 2 in) long with smaller branches growing upright. The leaves are flattened, up to 8–18 mm (0.31–0.71 in) long and smooth. The flowers are borne in clusters of four to six, tubular, 7–12 mm (0.28–0.47 in) long, 1.5–2 mm (0.059–0.079 in) in diameter, white when young, turning red with age, style 12–20 mm (0.47–0.79 in) long, red, peduncle about 1 mm (0.039 in) long. The bracts leaf-like or triangular shaped, dry and 3–16 mm (0.12–0.63 in) long, bracteoles oblong-shaped, 4–8 mm (0.16–0.31 in) long and yellowish green or yellow brown. Flowering occurs usually from July to October and the fruit is a small 2.4 mm (0.094 in) in diameter single seed.

== Taxonomy and naming ==
This darwinia was described in 1867 by English botanist George Bentham as Darwinia taxifolia var. grandiflora. In 1917 Richard Thomas Baker & Henry George Smith raised the variety to species status to Darwinia grandiflora and the description was published in Journal and Proceedings of the Royal Society of New South Wales. The specific epithet (grandiflora) refers to the "large flowers".

== Distribution and habitat ==
Darwinia grandiflora grows in wet heath, damp sandy soil and rocky outcrops south of Sydney on the Woronora Plateau and in the Illawarra region.
