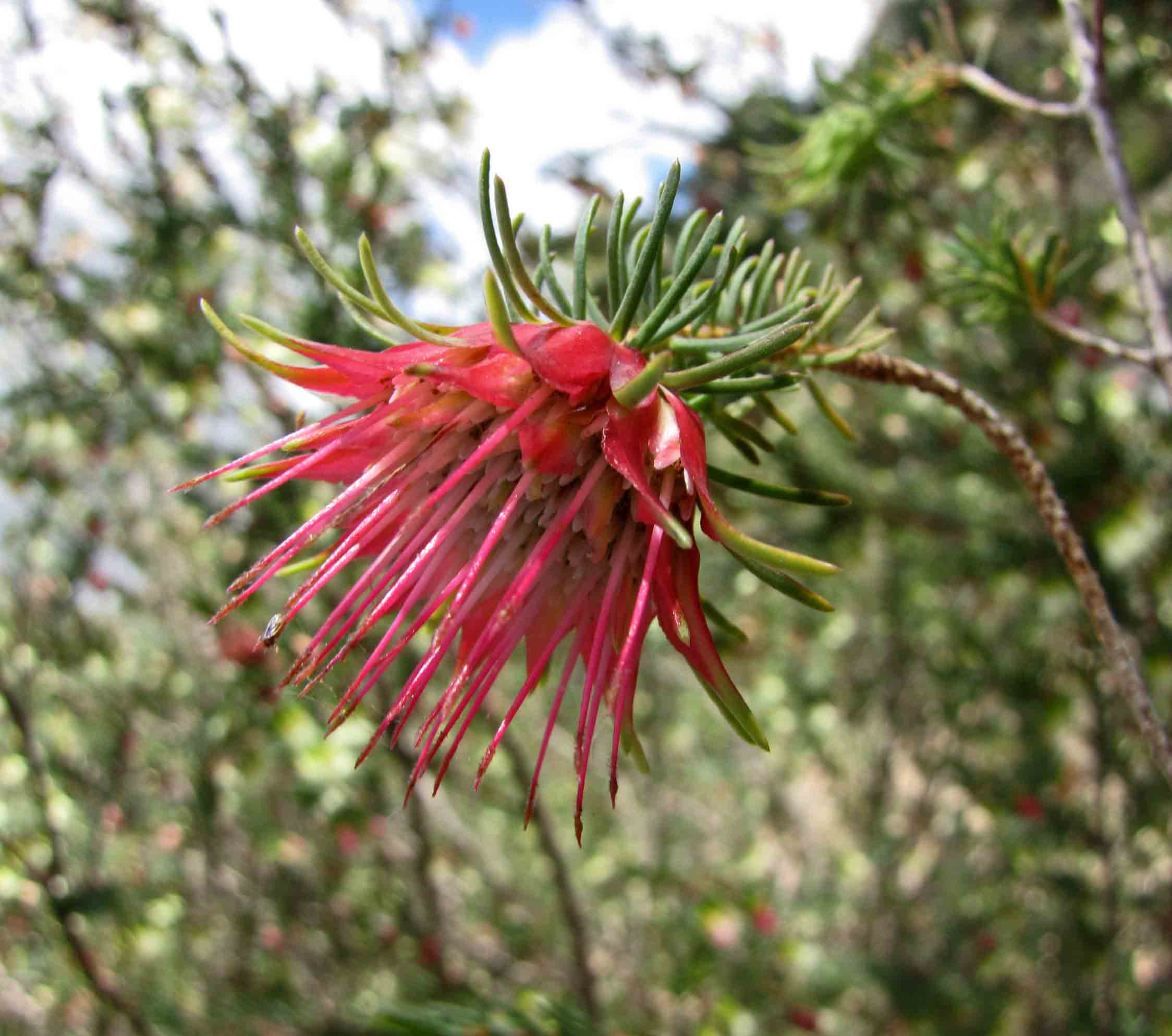

Conservation status
- Vulnerable (EPBC Act)

Scientific classification
- Kingdom: Plantae
- Clade: Tracheophytes
- Clade: Angiosperms
- Clade: Eudicots
- Clade: Rosids
- Order: Myrtales
- Family: Myrtaceae
- Genus: Darwinia
- Species: D. masonii

Binomial name
- Darwinia masonii C.A.Gardner
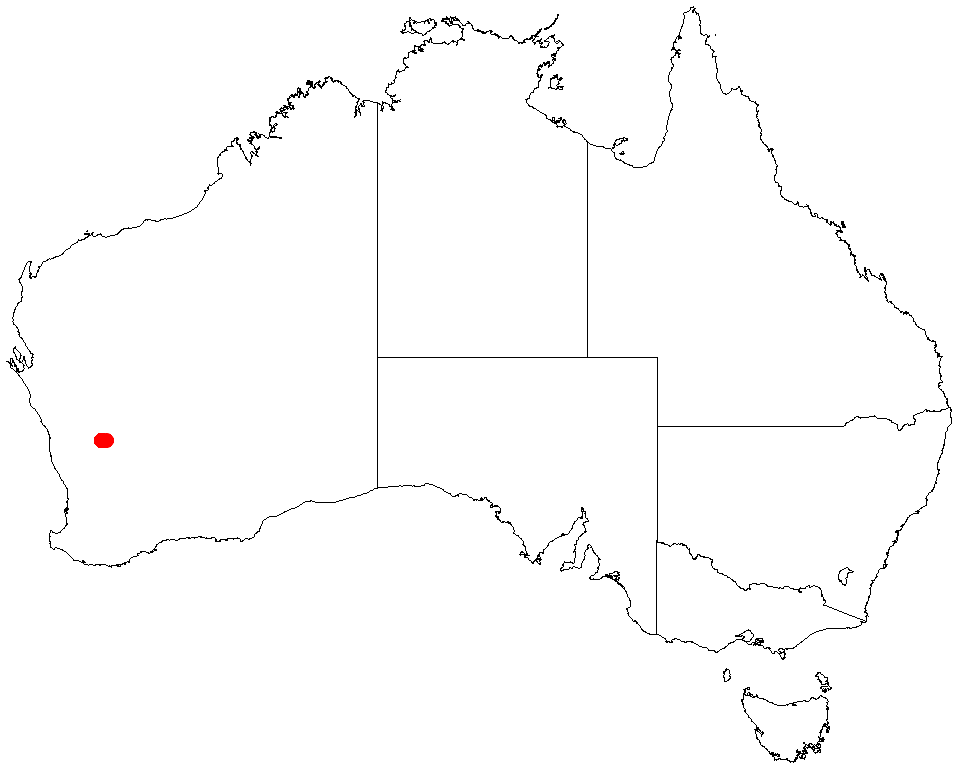
- Occurrence data from AVH

= Darwinia masonii =

Mason's darwinia

Species of flowering plant

Darwinia masonii, commonly known as Mason's darwinia is a plant in the myrtle family Myrtaceae and is endemic to Western Australia.

== Description ==
Darwinia masonii is an erect shrub typically growing to a height of 1–3 m (3.3–9.8 ft). It has closely crowded and narrow grey-green leaves that are approximately 1 cm (0.39 in) in length and almost triangular in cross section. The inflorescence consists of several small, pendant, tubular red flowers approximately 3 cm (1.2 in) in diameter and 5 mm (0.20 in) long. The flowers are surrounded by spreading pinkish pendulous bracts at the ends of small branchlets. The bracts have a prominent midrib and are wider at the base and narrower toward the apex. The style is about 1.5 cm (0.59 in) long. It blooms usually between April and November.

== Taxonomy and naming ==
Mason's darwinia was first formally described in 1964 by Charles Gardner and published in the Journal of the Royal Society of Western Australia. The specific epithet (masonii) honours D. Mason collector of the type specimen.

== Distribution and habitat ==
Darwinia masonii has a restricted distribution, endemic to a small area in the Mt Gibson Ranges in the Wheatbelt region of Western Australia. This species is found generally on upper hillsides and ridges above 330 m (1,100 ft) on shallow clay soils over laterite, ironstone, granite or near creeks.

== Conservation status ==
Darwinia masonii is listed as a vulnerable species in Western Australia and in terms of the Australian Government Environment Protection and Biodiversity Conservation Act 1999.
