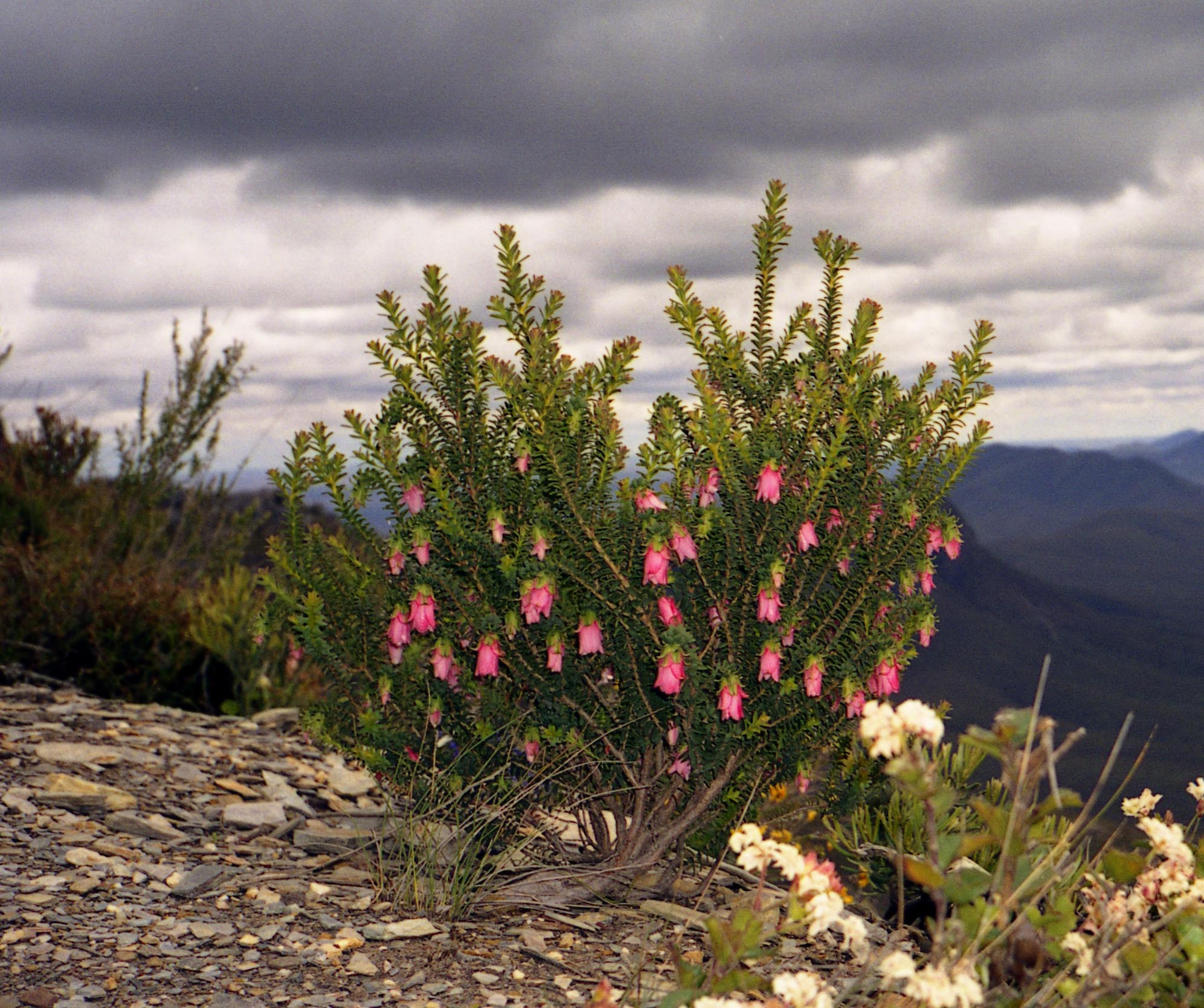
- In the Stirling Range

Conservation status
- Priority Four — Rare Taxa (DEC)

Scientific classification
- Kingdom: Plantae
- Clade: Tracheophytes
- Clade: Angiosperms
- Clade: Eudicots
- Clade: Rosids
- Order: Myrtales
- Family: Myrtaceae
- Genus: Darwinia
- Species: D. leiostyla

Binomial name
- Darwinia leiostyla (Turcz.) Domin
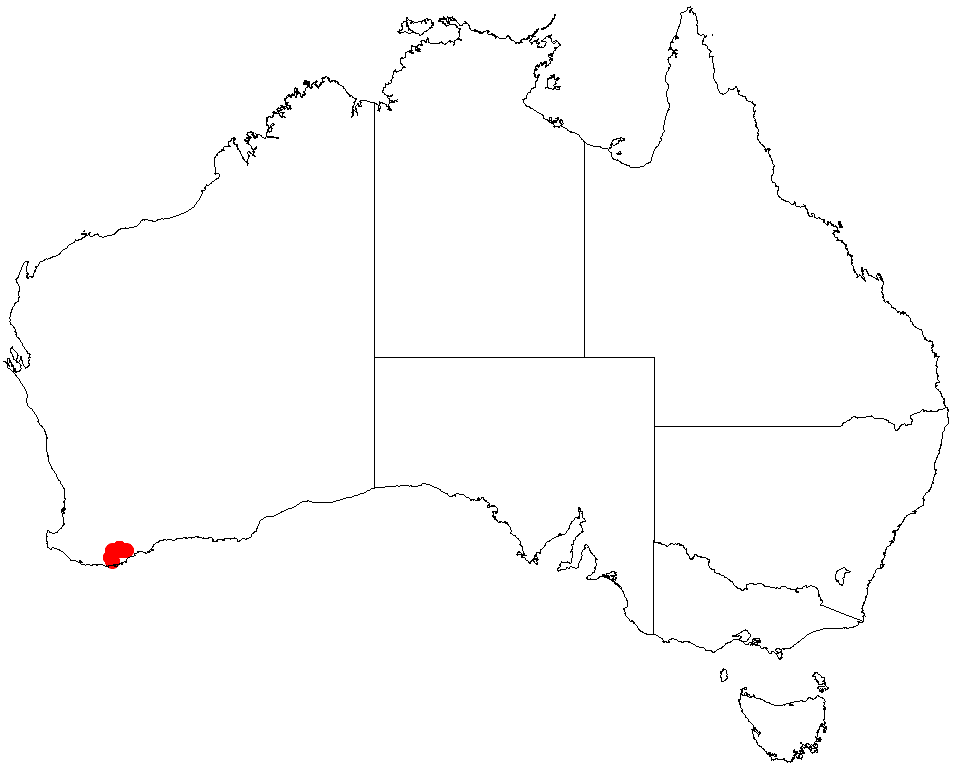
- Occurrence data from AVH

Synonyms
- Darwinia lejostyla Domin; Genetyllis leiostyla Turcz.

= Darwinia leiostyla =

Species of flowering plant

Darwinia leiostyla is an erect shrub in the family Myrtaceae and is endemic to the south-west of Western Australia. It typically grows to a height of 0.3–1.5 m (1 ft 0 in – 4 ft 11 in) and has linear leaves up to about 10 mm (0.39 in) long crowded along the branches. Pendent, bell-shaped, flower-like inflorescences appear from May to January. These are clusters of small flowers surrounded by larger pink, red or white, petal-like bracts.

== Taxonomy ==
This species was first formally described in 1852 by Nikolai Turczaninow who gave it the name Genetyllis leiostyla in the Bulletin de la Classe Physico-Mathématique de l'Académie Impériale des Sciences de Saint-Pétersbourg. In 1923, Karel Domin changed the name to Darwinia leiostyla in Vestnik Kralovske Ceske Spolecnosti Nauk, Trida Matematiko-Prirodevedecke. The specific epithet (leiostyla) means "having a smooth style".

== Distribution and habitat ==
Darwinia leiostyla occurs in the Stirling Range and Middle Mount Barren on rocky sites, along streamlines and on slopes within gullies and ranges.

== Conservation status ==
Darwinia leiostyla is classified as "Priority Four" by the Government of Western Australia Department of Parks and Wildlife, meaning that is rare or near threatened.

== Use in horticulture ==
This darwinia is sometimes grown as an ornamental plant. It requires a warm, dry situation and tip pruning to maintain its shape. It is suitable for container growing or rock gardens.

== Gallery ==
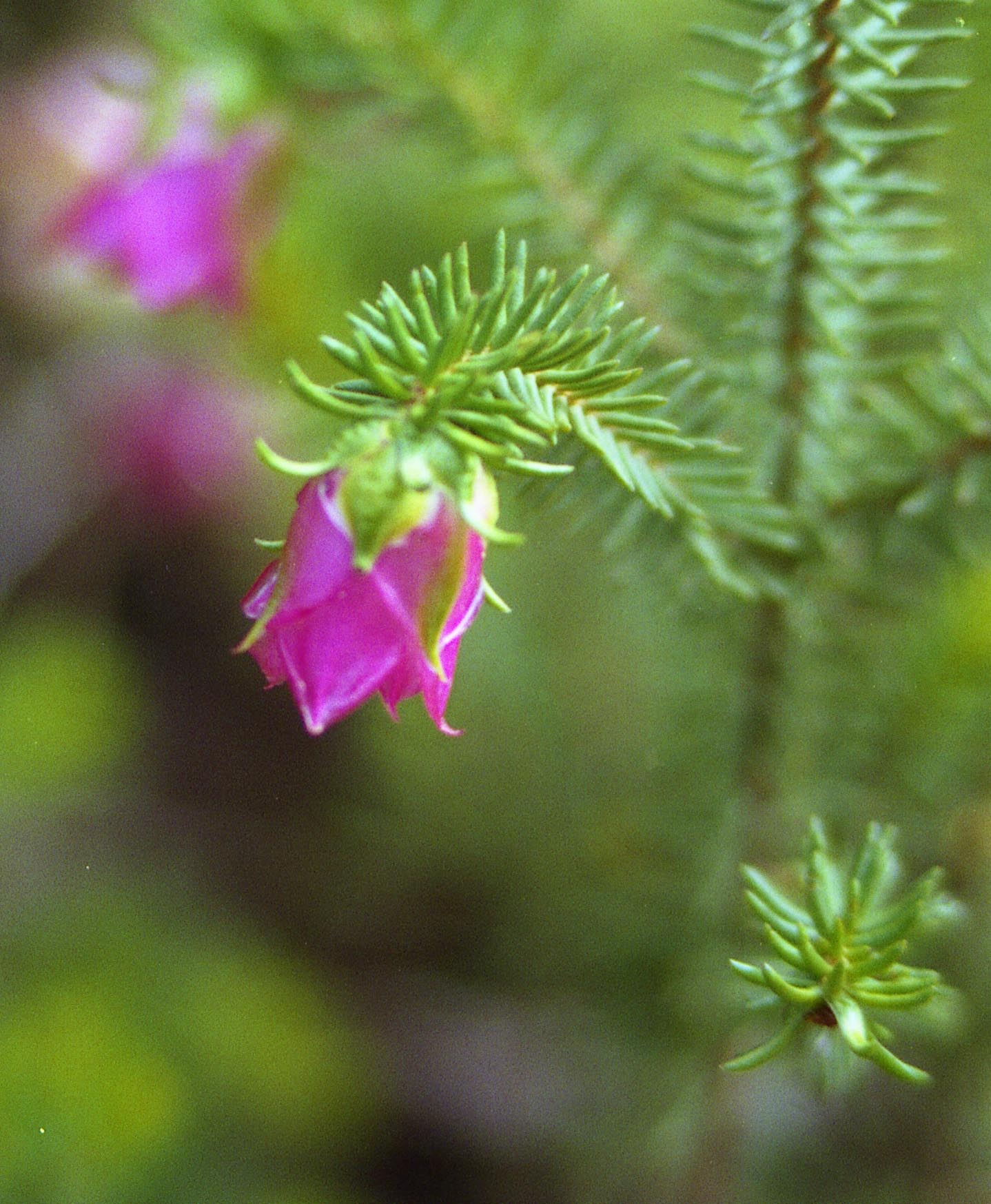
D. leiostyla flower
