= Darwinia terricola =

Blackwood bell

Conservation status
- Priority One — Poorly Known Taxa (DEC)

Scientific classification
- Kingdom: Plantae
- Clade: Tracheophytes
- Clade: Angiosperms
- Clade: Eudicots
- Clade: Rosids
- Order: Myrtales
- Family: Myrtaceae
- Genus: Darwinia
- Species: D. terricola

Binomial name
- Darwinia terricola Keighery

Species of flowering plant

Darwinia terricola, commonly known as the Blackwood bell, is a species of flowering plant in the myrtle family Myrtaceae and is endemic to a small area in the south-west of Western Australia. It is a small, low, sometimes prostrate shrub with small, linear leaves and small groups of flowers surrounded by reddish-green bracts and which usually lie on the ground.

== Description ==
Darwinia terricola is a spreading or prostrate shrub which grows to 20 centimetres (8 in) tall and 30 centimetres (10 in) wide and which has many stems spreading from a woody base. Its leaves are linear in shape, 4–9 millimetres (0.2–0.4 in) long and less than 0.7 millimetres (0.03 in) wide, triangular in cross-section and with scattered cilia along the edges. The flowers are arranged in groups, usually of between five and seven, the groups 17–19 millimetres (0.67–0.75 in) long and 10–12 millimetres (0.4–0.5 in) wide. The flowers are surrounded by several rows of leaf-like bracts which are green at first, but which turn reddish-green and increase in size to 13–20 millimetres (0.5–0.8 in) long and 2 millimetres (0.08 in) wide as the flowers develop. The groups of flowers lie on the ground or on top of leaves, each flower brown, tube-shaped and 3–4 millimetres (0.1–0.2 in) long with five ridges on the sides. The petals are white with a curved style 11–12 millimetres (0.4–0.5 in) long extending beyond the petal tube. There is a ring of short hairs near the end of the style. Flowering occurs in November and December.

== Taxonomy and naming ==
Darwinia terricola was first formally described in 2012 by Greg Keighery from a specimen collected in the Blackwood State Forest between Margaret River and Nannup. The description was published in the Western Australian Naturalist. The specific epithet (terricola) is derived from the Latin word terra meaning "earth", "ground" or "soil" and the suffix -cola meaning "inhabitant", referring to the prostrate habit of this species and the manner in which the flowers lie on the ground.

== Distribution and habitat ==
Blackwood bell is only known from the Blackwood State Forest in the Jarrah Forest and Warrenbioregions, where it grows in sandy clay in mallee shrubland.

== Conservation status ==
Darwinia terricola is classified as "Threatened Flora (Declared Rare Flora — Extant)" by the Western Australian Government Department of Parks and Wildlife.
