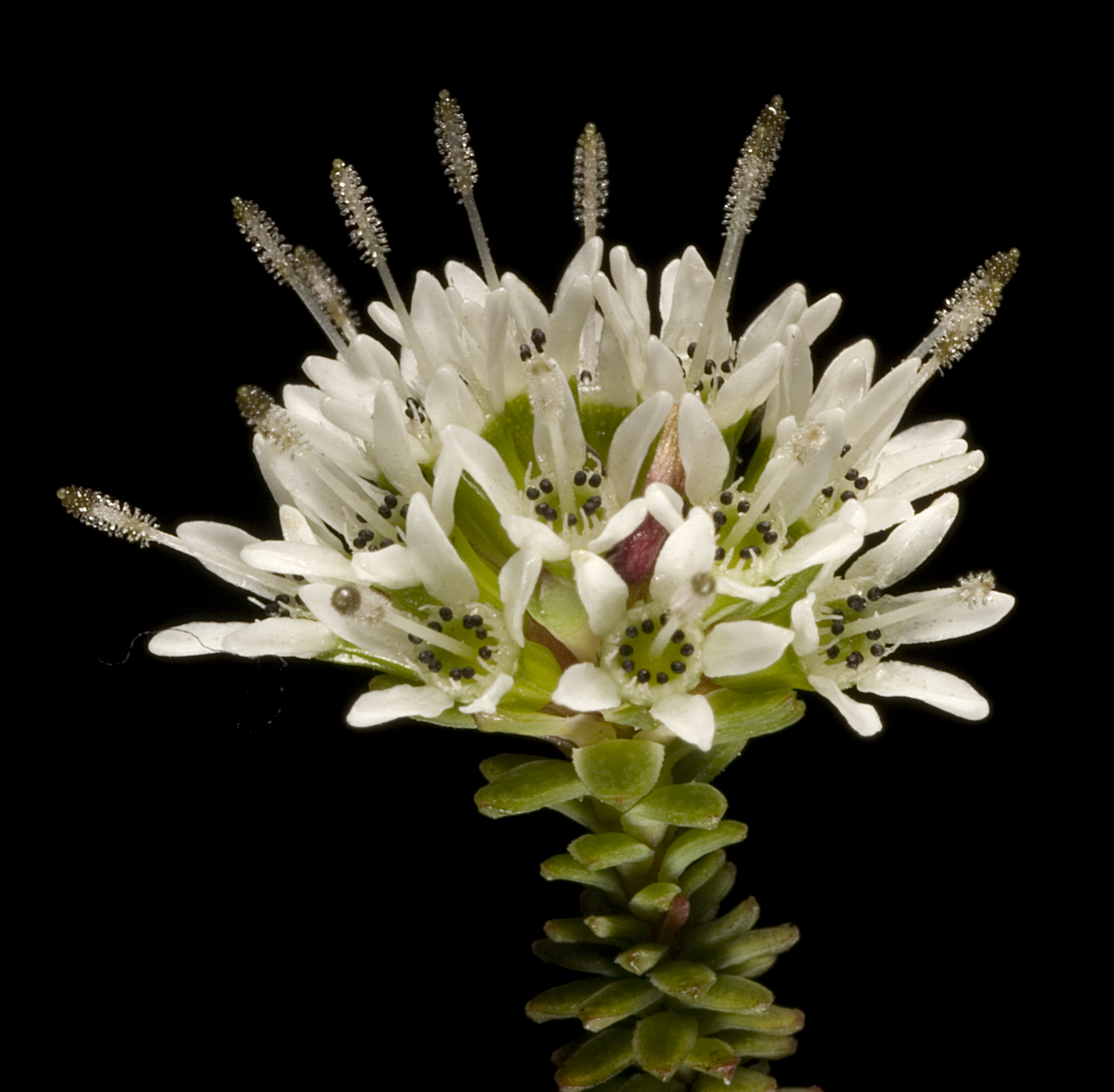

Scientific classification
- Kingdom: Plantae
- Clade: Tracheophytes
- Clade: Angiosperms
- Clade: Eudicots
- Clade: Rosids
- Order: Myrtales
- Family: Myrtaceae
- Genus: Darwinia
- Species: D. vestita

Binomial name
- Darwinia vestita (Endl.) Benth.
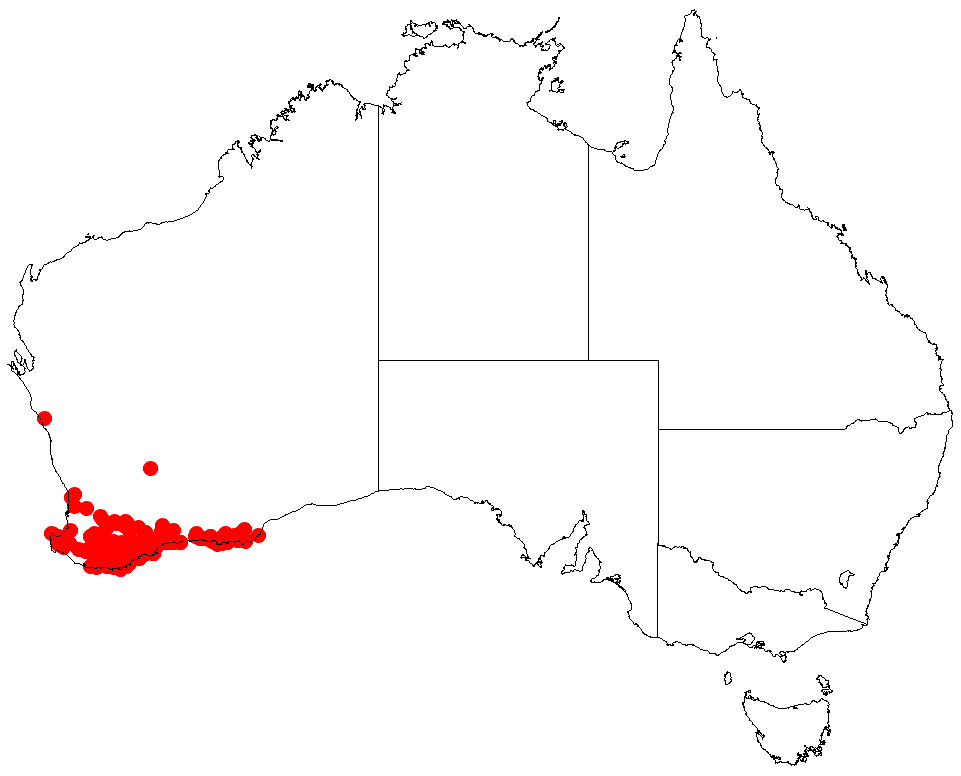
- Occurrence data from AVH

Synonyms
- Genetyllis agathosmoides Turcz.; Genetyllis vestita Endl.

= Darwinia vestita =

Pom pom darwinia

Species of flowering plant

Darwinia vestita, commonly known as pom-pom darwinia, is a species of flowering plant in the family Myrtaceae and is endemic to the southwest of Western Australia. It is an erect, bushy shrub with crowded egg-shaped, oblong, or linear leaves and more or less spherical heads of white to reddish-pink flowers.

== Description ==
Darwinia vestita is an erect, bushy shrub that typically grows to height of 0.2–1 m (7.9 in – 3 ft 3.4 in) and has both short, and long arching branches. Its leaves are crowded, egg-shaped, oblong to almost linear, 2–4.5 mm (0.079–0.177 in) long, the upper surface concave and the lower surface with a prominent keel. The flowers are arranged in more or less spherical heads on a peduncle about 2 mm (0.079 in) long with bracts that fall off as the flowers open. The sepals are about 4 mm (0.16 in) long with small, scale-like lobes, the petals white or reddish-pink and about 2 mm (0.079 in) long. Flowering occurs from July to December.

== Taxonomy ==
This species was first formally described in 1837 by Stephan Endlicher who gave it the name Genetyllis vestita in Enumeratio plantarum quas in Novae Hollandiæ ora austro-occidentali ad fluvium Cygnorum et in sinu Regis Georgii collegit Carolus Liber Baro de Hügel. In 1865, George Bentham changed the name to Darwinia vestita and published the change in the Journal of the Linnean Society, Botany. The specific epithet (vestita) means "clothed" or "covered", referring to the overlapping leaves in herbarium specimens.

== Distribution and habitat ==
Darwinia vestita is found on stony hillsides, sandplains, granite outcrops, coastal areas and swamps in a wide area of the Avon Wheatbelt, Esperance Plains, Jarrah Forest, Mallee, Swan Coastal Plain and Warren bioregions of south-western Western Australia.
