= Darwinia luehmannii =

Conservation status
- Priority Two — Poorly Known Taxa (DEC)

Scientific classification
- Kingdom: Plantae
- Clade: Tracheophytes
- Clade: Angiosperms
- Clade: Eudicots
- Clade: Rosids
- Order: Myrtales
- Family: Myrtaceae
- Genus: Darwinia
- Species: D. luehmannii

Binomial name
- Darwinia luehmannii F.Muell. & Tate

Species of flowering plant

Darwinia luehmannii is a flowering plant in the myrtle family Myrtaceae and is endemic to Western Australia.

It is a spreading, dense shrub that typically grows to 0.1 to 0.5 metres (0 to 2 ft) high. Flowering occurs between May and November producing white and green flowers. Often found in flat depressions or at the bases of rocks near Esperance where it grows in sandy loamy soils.

This darwinia was first formally described 1896 by Ferdinand von Mueller and Ralph Tate and the description was published in Transactions, proceedings and report, Royal Society of South Australia. The specific epithet (luehmannii) is in honour of Johann Georg Luehmann.
