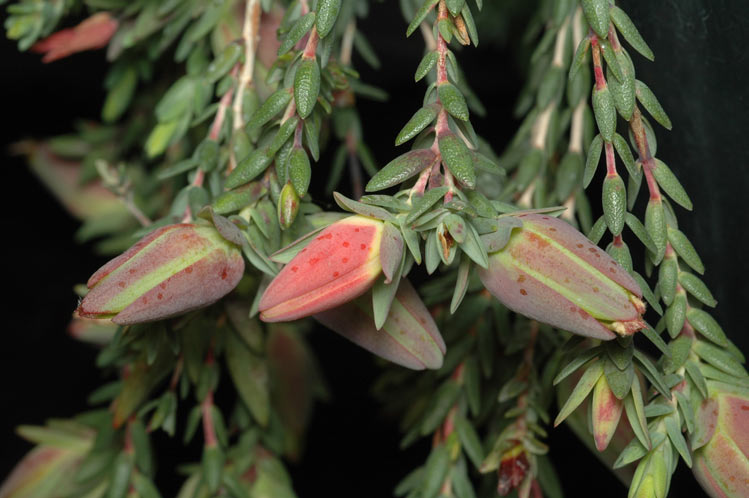
- In the Australian National Botanic Gardens

Scientific classification
- Kingdom: Plantae
- Clade: Tracheophytes
- Clade: Angiosperms
- Clade: Eudicots
- Clade: Rosids
- Order: Myrtales
- Family: Myrtaceae
- Genus: Darwinia
- Species: D. speciosa

Binomial name
- Darwinia speciosa (Meisn.) Benth.
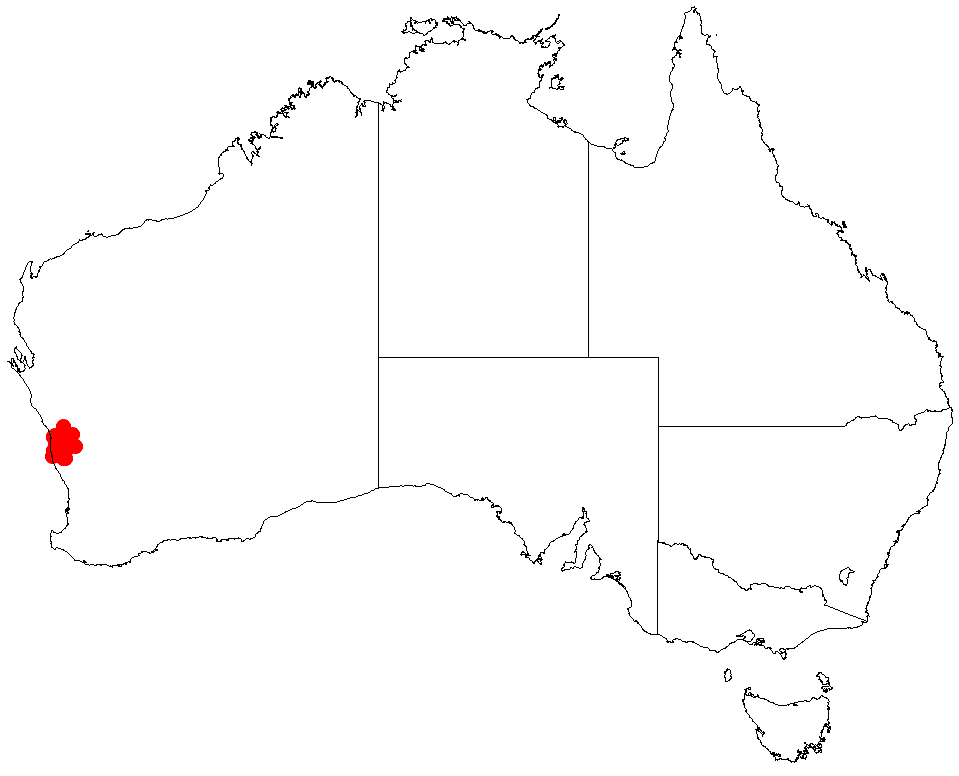
- Occurrence data from AVH

Synonyms
- Genetyllis speciosa Meisn.

= Darwinia speciosa =

Species of flowering plant

Darwinia speciosa is a plant in the myrtle family Myrtaceae and is endemic to the southwest of Western Australia. It is a dwarf, spreading or prostrate shrub with narrowly oblong leaves arranged in opposite pairs, and greenish flowers surrounded by larger dark red or brownish involucral bracts.

== Description ==
Darwinia speciosa is a dwarf, erect, spreading or prostrate shrub that typically grows to a height of 10–30 cm (3.9–11.8 in). The leaves are narrowly oblong, 4–9 mm (0.16–0.35 in) long, and concave. The flowers are greenish, arranged in bell-shaped heads of 8 to 10 surrounded and hidden by dark red or brownish bracts about 30 mm (1.2 in) long. The sepals are about 6.5 mm (0.26 in) long with egg-shaped lobes, the petals triangular and about 2 mm (0.079 in) long. Flowering mainly occurs from July to November.

== Taxonomy ==
This species was first formally described in 1857 by Carl Meissner who gave it the name Genetyllis speciosa in the Journal of the Proceedings of the Linnean Society, Botany from material collected near the Hill River by James Drummond. In 1865, George Bentham changed the name to Darwinia speciosa in a later edition of the same journal. The specific epithet (speciosa) means "showy".

== Distribution and habitat ==
Darwinia speciosa mainly grows in sandy kwongan in the Avon Wheatbelt, Geraldton Sandplains and Swan Coastal Plain bioregions of south-western Western Australia.
