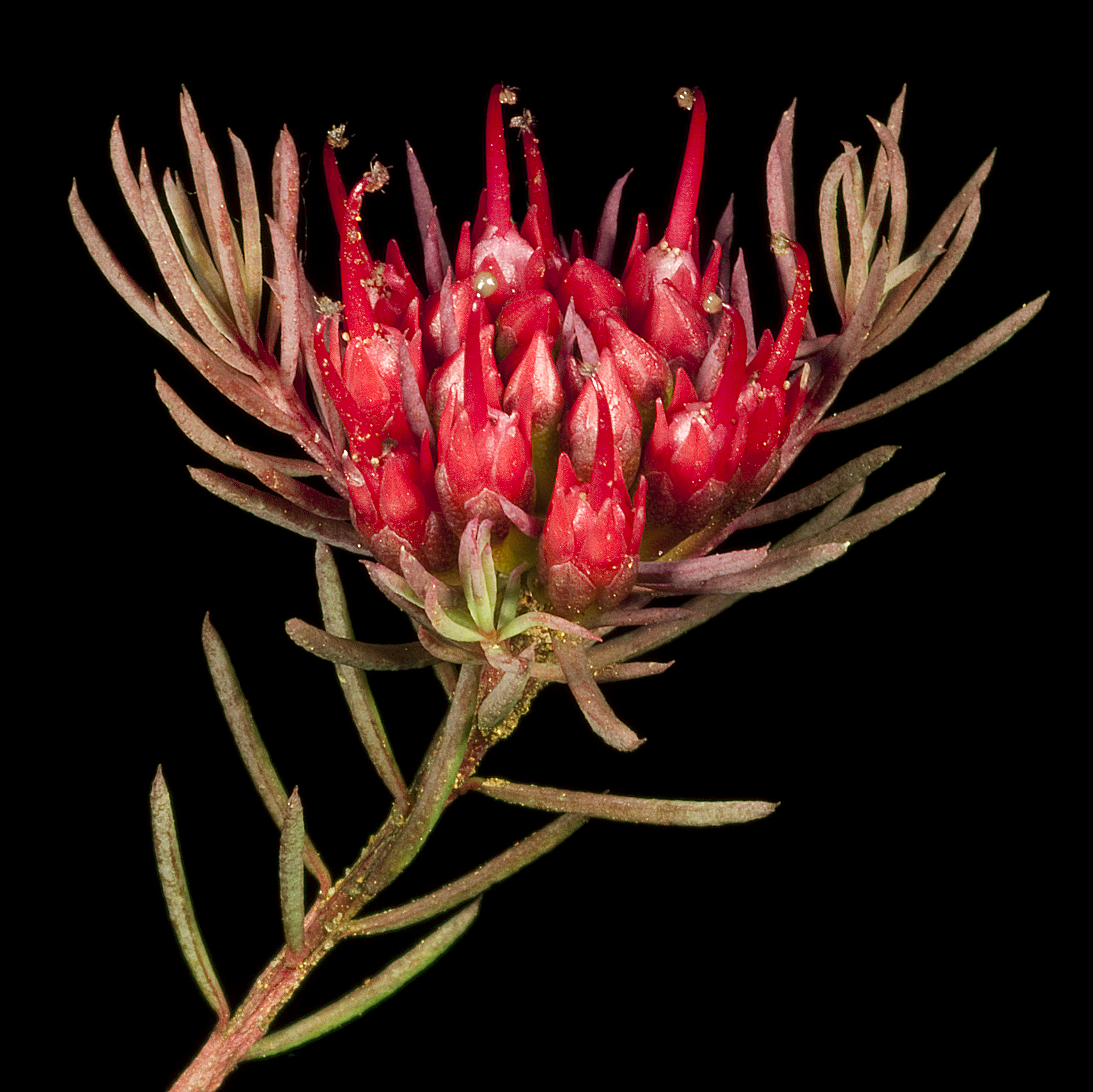

Scientific classification
- Kingdom: Plantae
- Clade: Tracheophytes
- Clade: Angiosperms
- Clade: Eudicots
- Clade: Rosids
- Order: Myrtales
- Family: Myrtaceae
- Genus: Darwinia
- Species: D. pinifolia

Binomial name
- Darwinia pinifolia (Lindl.) Benth.
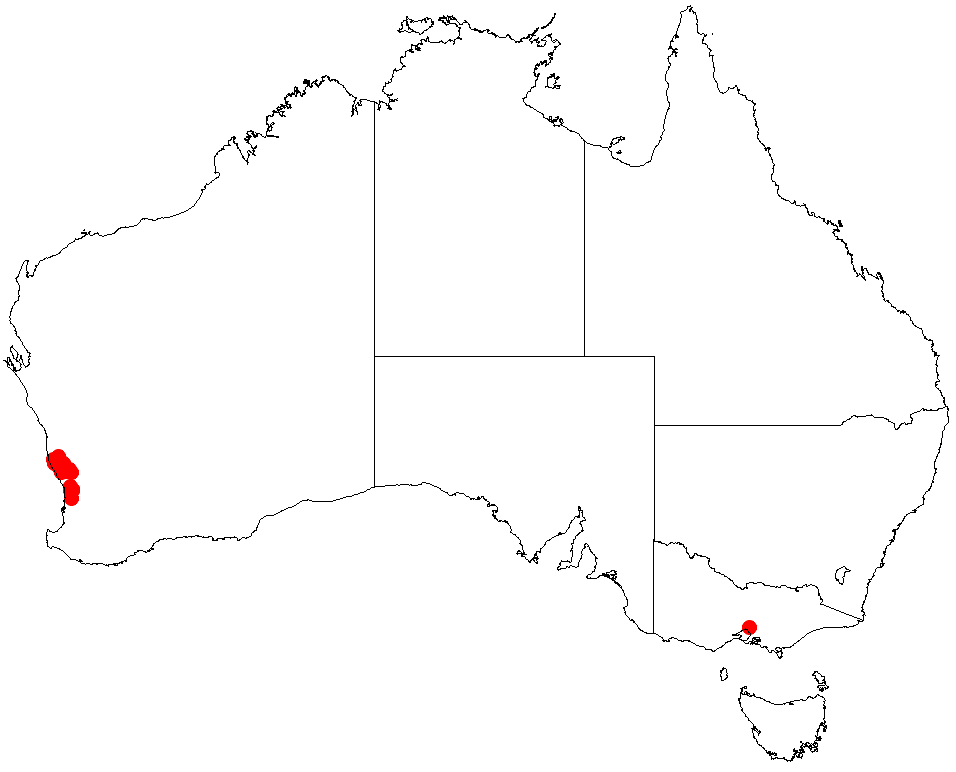
- Occurrence data from AVH

= Darwinia pinifolia =

Species of flowering plant

Darwinia pinifolia is a species of flowering plant in the family Myrtaceae and is endemic to the southwest of Western Australia. It is a low, spreading to prostrate shrub with linear leaves and dense heads of erect, red to purple flowers.

== Description ==
Darwinia pinifolia is a low, spreading to prostrate shrub that typically grows to height of 10–50 cm (3.9–19.7 in) and has many branches. Its leaves are linear, more or less round to triangular in cross-section, about 12 mm (0.47 in) long and more or less sessile. The flowers are erect, red to purple, arranged in dense heads on the ends of branches, surrounded by egg-shaped or spatula-shaped bracteoles that are shorter than the flowers. The sepal tube is nearly 6.5 mm (0.26 in) long with broadly egg-shaped lobes about as long as the petals. Flowering occurs from September to February.

== Taxonomy ==
This species was first formally described in 1839 by John Lindley who gave it the name Hedaroma pinifolium in A Sketch of the Vegetation of the Swan River Colony. In 1865, George Bentham changed the name to Pimelea pinifolia in Journal of the Linnean Society, Botany. The specific epithet (pinifolia) means "pine-leaved".

== Distribution and habitat ==
Darwinia pinifolia is typically found in sandy soils in winter-wet areas in the Geraldton Sandplains, Jarrah Forest and Swan Coastal Plain bioregions of south-western Western Australia.
