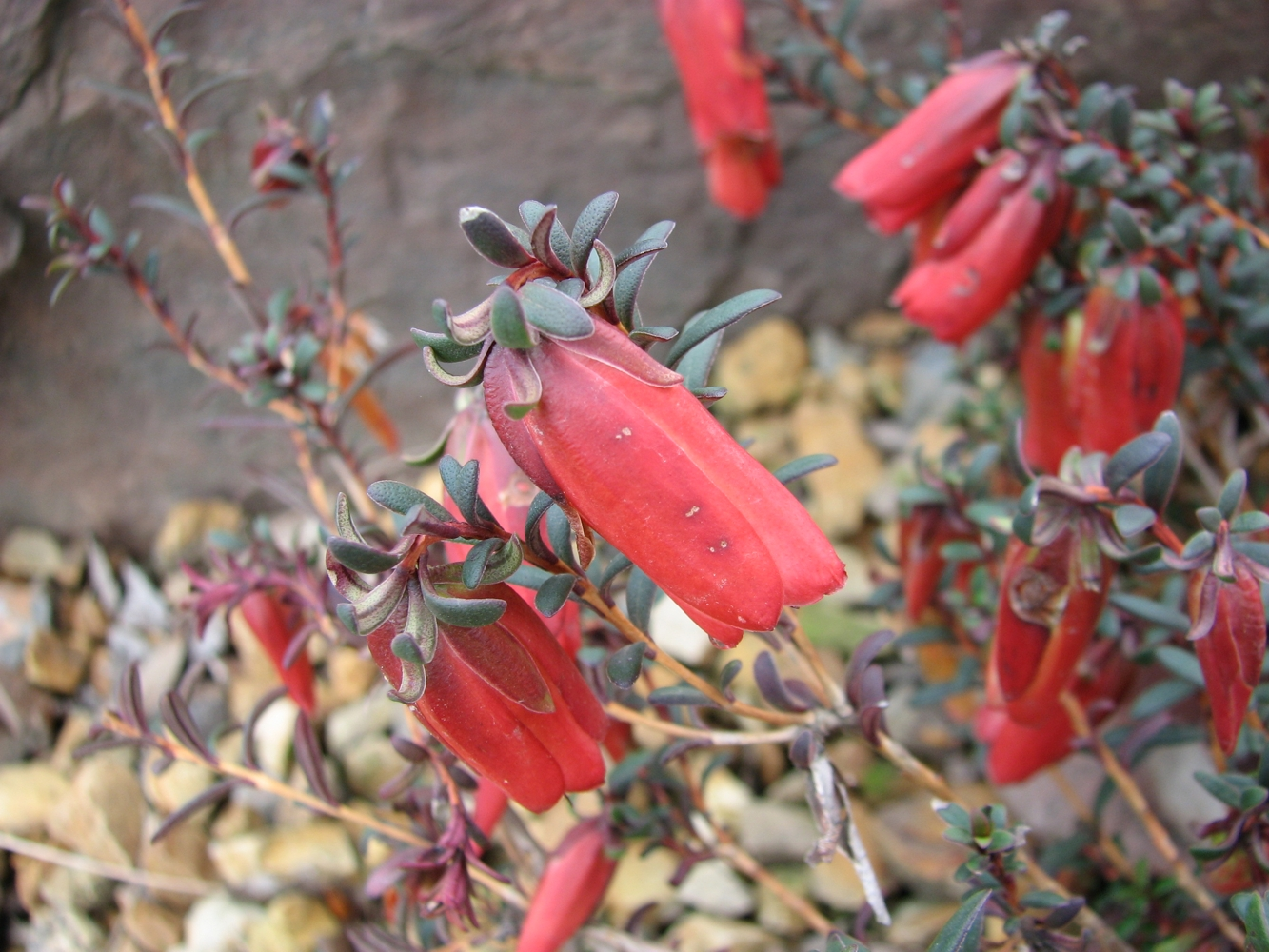
- In the Australian National Botanic Gardens

Conservation status
- Priority Four — Rare Taxa (DEC)

Scientific classification
- Kingdom: Plantae
- Clade: Tracheophytes
- Clade: Angiosperms
- Clade: Eudicots
- Clade: Rosids
- Order: Myrtales
- Family: Myrtaceae
- Genus: Darwinia
- Species: D. hypericifolia

Binomial name
- Darwinia hypericifolia (Turcz.) Domin
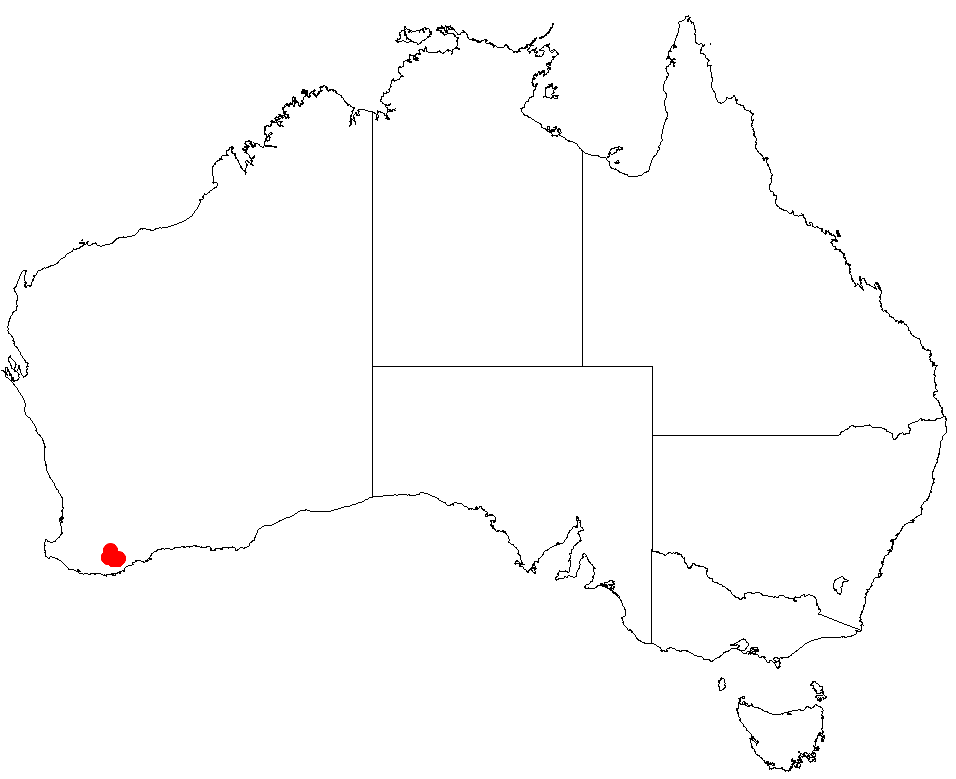
- Occurrence data from AVH

Synonyms
- Genetyllis hypericifolia Turcz.

= Darwinia hypericifolia =

Species of flowering plant

Darwinia hypericifolia is a species of flowering plant in the myrtle family Myrtaceae and is endemic to the south-west of Western Australia. It is an erect, straggly shrub that typically grows to a height of 0.4–1 m (1 ft 4 in – 3 ft 3 in) and has clusters of flowers surrounded by red bracts, mainly in October and November.

The species was first formally described in 1852 by Nikolai Turczaninow who gave it the name Genetyllis hypericifolia in the Bulletin de la Classe Physico-Mathématique de l'Académie Impériale des Sciences de Saint-Pétersbourg. In 1923, Karel Domin changed the name to Darwinia hypericifolia inVestnik Kralovske Ceske Spolecnosti Nauk, Trida Matematiko-Prirodevedecke.

Darwinia hypericifolia occurs on peaty sand on the slopes of mountains in the Stirling Range in the Esperance Plains bioregion of south-western Western Australia. It is listed as "Priority Four" by the Government of Western Australia Department of Biodiversity, Conservation and Attractions, meaning that it is rare or near threatened.
