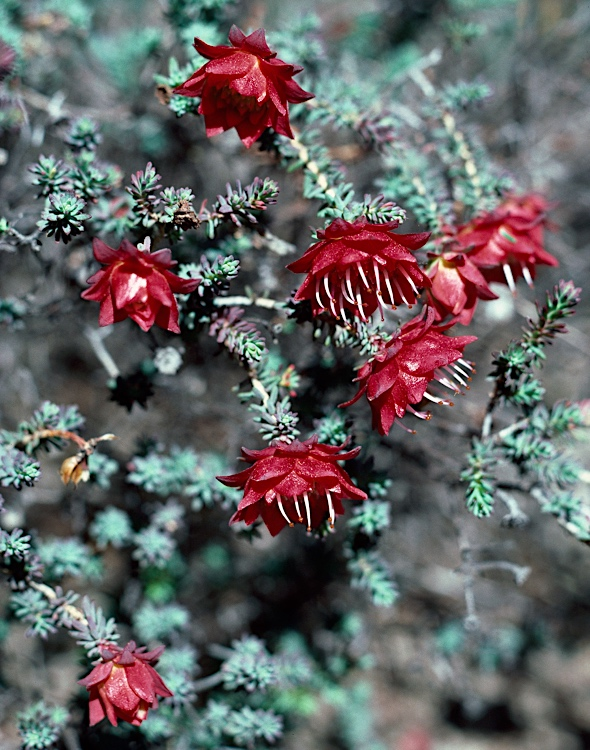
- Near Koorda, Western Australia

Scientific classification
- Kingdom: Plantae
- Clade: Tracheophytes
- Clade: Angiosperms
- Clade: Eudicots
- Clade: Rosids
- Order: Myrtales
- Family: Myrtaceae
- Genus: Darwinia
- Species: D. purpurea

Binomial name
- Darwinia purpurea (Endl.) Benth.
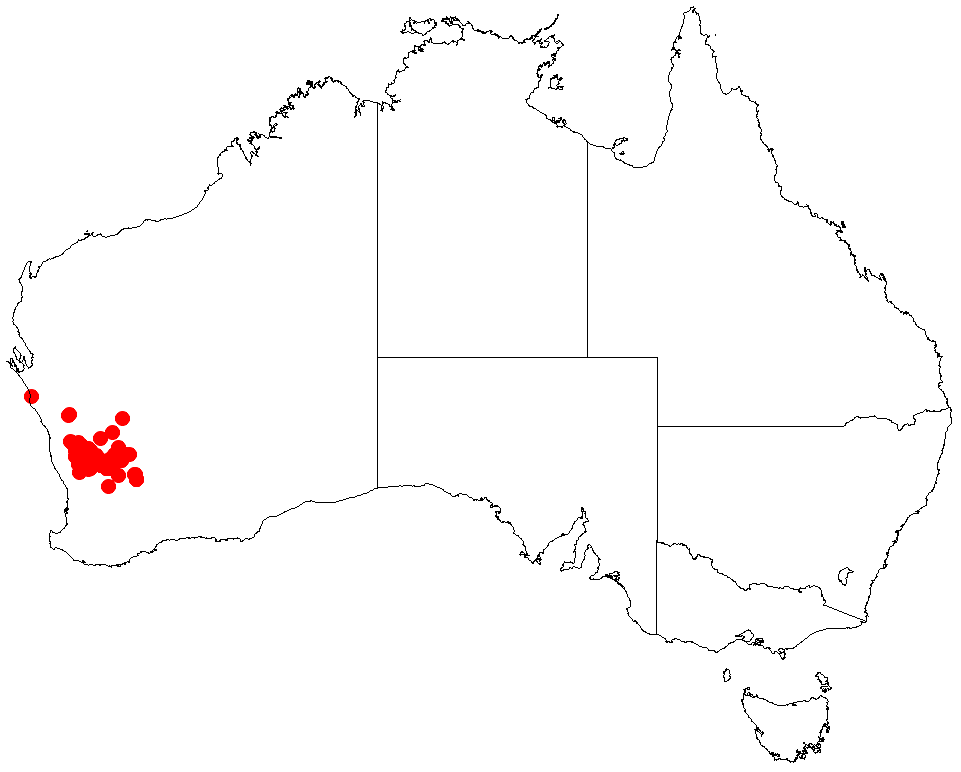
- Occurrence data from AVH

Synonyms
- Genetyllis purpurea (Endl.) Schauer; Polyzone purpurea Endl.

= Darwinia purpurea =

Species of flowering plant

Darwinia purpurea, commonly known as the rose darwinia, is a species of flowering plant in the family Myrtaceae and is endemic to the southwest of Western Australia. It is a spreading shrub with linear leaves and dense heads of red or yellow flowers surrounded by many overlapping involucral bracts.

== Description ==
Darwinia purpurea is a spreading shrub that typically grows to height of 10–50 cm (3.9–19.7 in) and has many branches. Its leaves are linear, 2–4 mm (0.079–0.157 in) long, the upper surface flat and the lower surface convex. The flowers are arranged in dense, hemispherical heads surrounded by a large number of overlapping egg-shaped or spatula-shaped involucral bracts that are slightly longer than the flowers. The sepal tube is about 4 mm (0.16 in) long with small, scale-like lobes, the petals about 2 mm (0.079 in) long. Flowering occurs from July to December.

== Taxonomy ==
This species was first formally described in 1838 by Stephan Endlicher who gave it the name Polyzone purpurea in Stirpium Australasicarum Herbarii Hugeliani Decades Tres. In 1865, George Bentham changed the name to Darwinia purpurea in Journal of the Linnean Society, Botany. The specific epithet (purpurea) means "purple".

== Distribution and habitat ==
Rose darwinia is often found on undulating plains and amongst granite outcrops in the Avon Wheatbelt, Coolgardie, Geraldton Sandplains and Yalgoo of south-western Western Australia, where it grows in sandy or lateritic soils.
