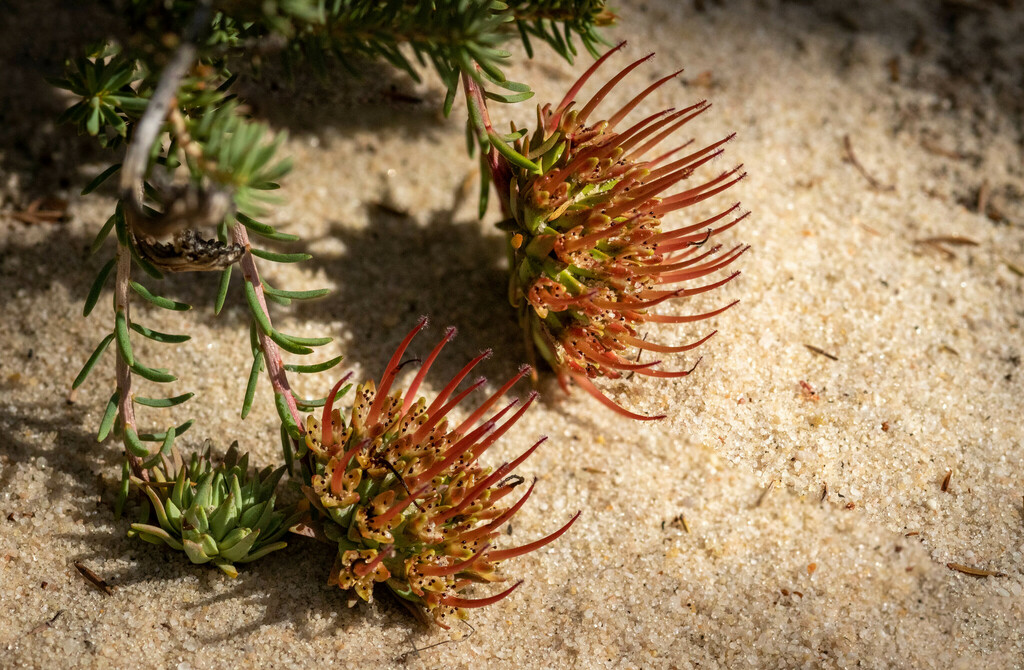
- In Kalbarri National Park

Scientific classification
- Kingdom: Plantae
- Clade: Tracheophytes
- Clade: Angiosperms
- Clade: Eudicots
- Clade: Rosids
- Order: Myrtales
- Family: Myrtaceae
- Genus: Darwinia
- Species: D. virescens

Binomial name
- Darwinia virescens (Meisn.) Benth.
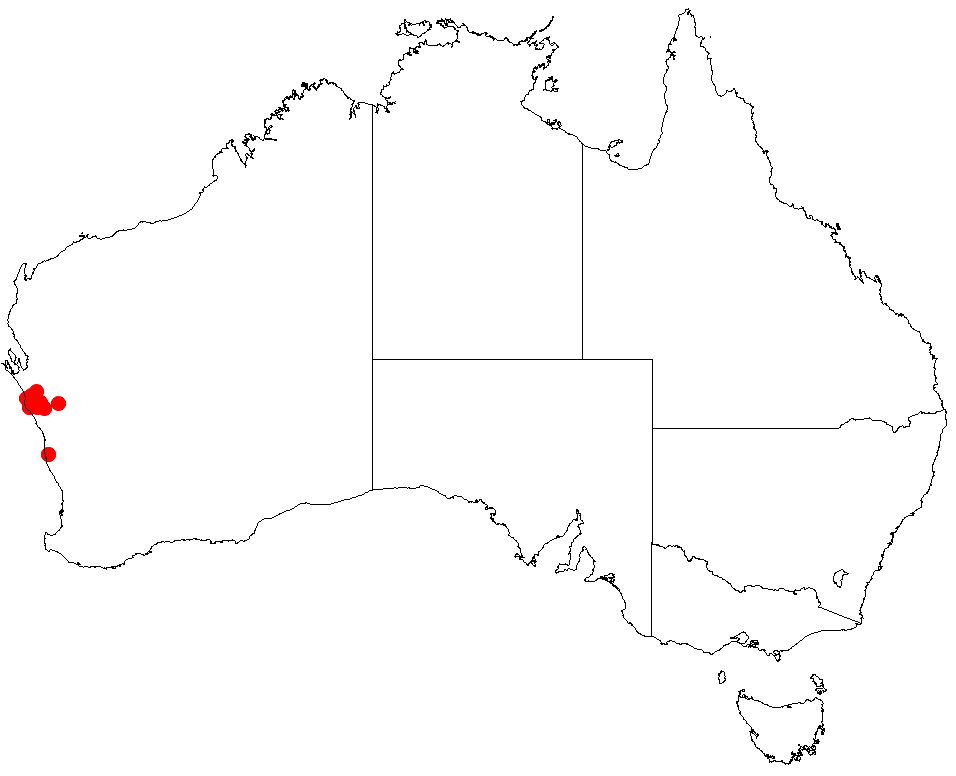
- Occurrence data from AVH

Synonyms
- Genetyllis virescens Meisn.

= Darwinia virescens =

Species of flowering plant

Darwinia virescens, commonly known as Murchison darwinia, is a species of flowering plant in the family Myrtaceae and is endemic to a small area on the west coast of Western Australia near Geraldton. It is a prostrate or low-lying shrub with crowded linear leaves and dense, hemispherical heads of green, yellow or red flowers.

== Description ==
Darwinia virescens prostrate or low-growing shrub that typically grows to height of 5–30 cm (2.0–11.8 in) and has both short, and thick, white bark. Its leaves are linear, round or triangular in cross-section, and mostly 6–8.5 mm (0.24–0.33 in) long. The flowers are green, yellow or red and arranged in dense, hemispherical heads more than 25 mm (0.98 in) in diameter, surrounded many lance-shaped involucral bracts that are shorter than the flowers. Each flower is on a thick, top-shaped pedicel. The sepals are about 8.5 mm (0.33 in) long, joined at the base to form a tube with 5 longitudinal ribs, the lobes about 1 mm (0.039 in) long, the petals nearly 4 mm (0.16 in) long. Flowering occurs from August to December.

== Taxonomy and naming ==
This species was first formally described in 1857 by Carl Meissner, who gave it the name Genetyllis virescens in the Journal of the Proceedings of the Linnean Society, Botany. In 1867, George Bentham changed the name to Darwinia virescens. The specific epithet (virescens) is a Latin word meaning "growing green or verdant".

== Distribution and habitat ==
Murchison Darwinia grows in sandy heath in the Geraldton Sandplains and Yalgoo biogeographic regions of Western Australia.

== Conservation status ==
Darwinia virescens is listed as "not threatened" by the Government of Western Australia Department of Biodiversity, Conservation and Attractions.

== Ecology ==
The flowers of Darwinia virescens (and of Darwinia sanguinea) are held at ground level and there is speculation that this suggests that they are pollinated by mammals.
