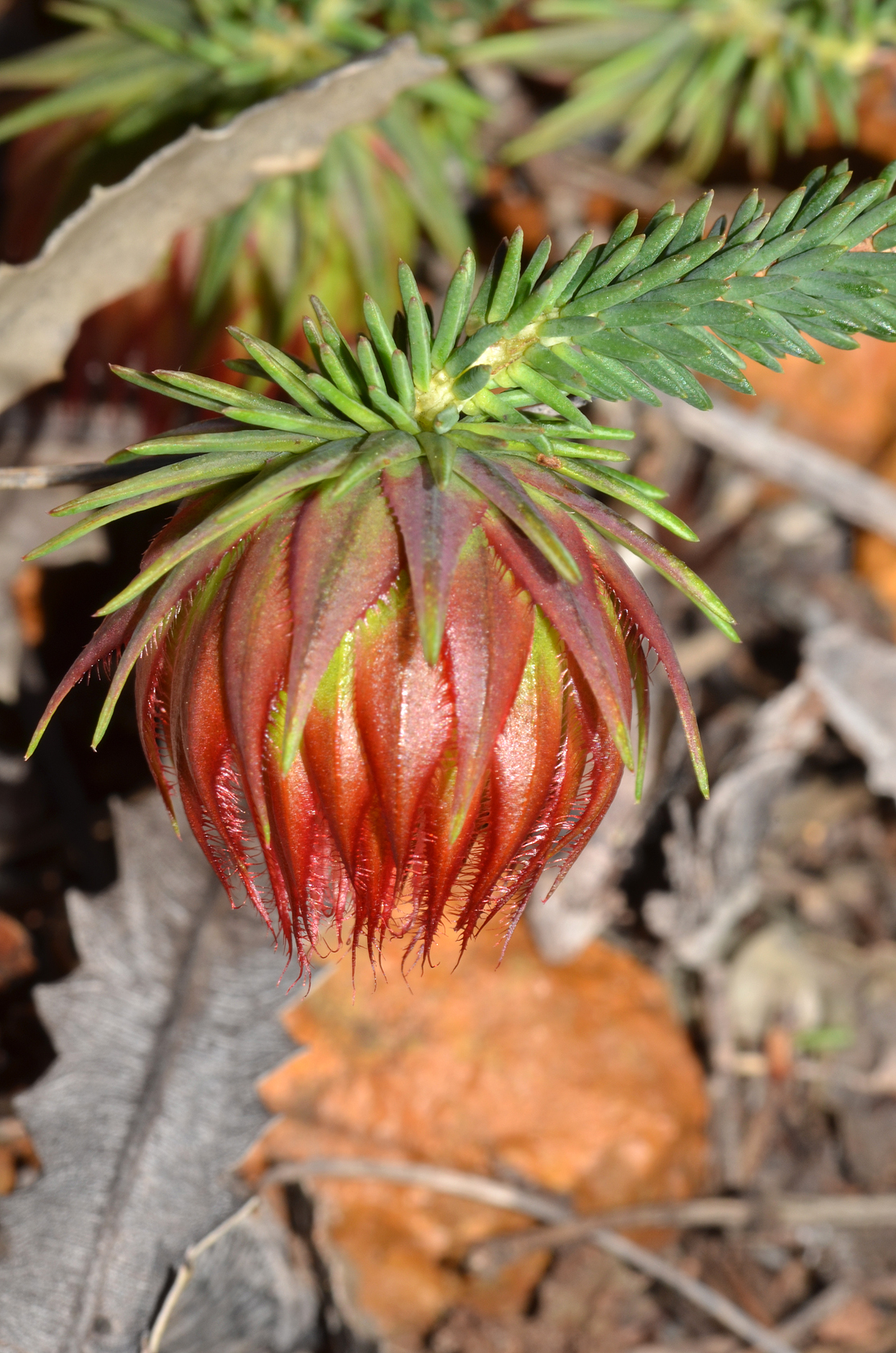
- Darwinia neildiana near Cataby

Scientific classification
- Kingdom: Plantae
- Clade: Tracheophytes
- Clade: Angiosperms
- Clade: Eudicots
- Clade: Rosids
- Order: Myrtales
- Family: Myrtaceae
- Genus: Darwinia
- Species: D. neildiana

Binomial name
- Darwinia neildiana F.Muell.
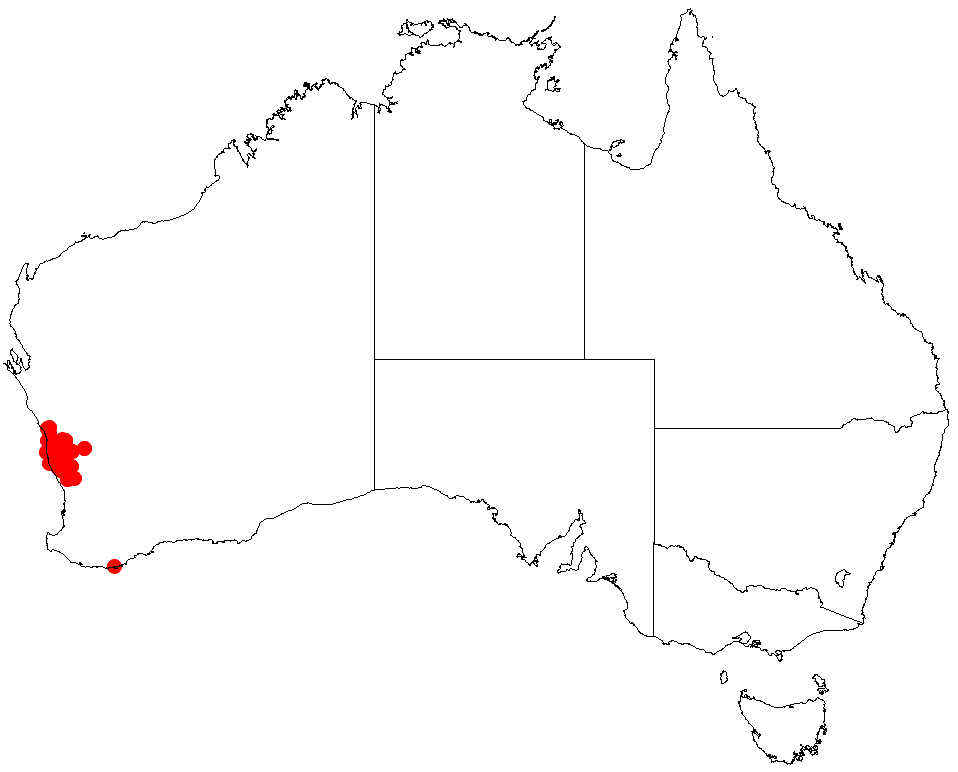
- Occurrence data from AVH

= Darwinia neildiana =

Fringed bell

Species of flowering plant

Darwinia neildiana, commonly known as fringed bell, is a species of flowering plant in the family Myrtaceae and is endemic to the south-west of Western Australia. It is a dwarf, spreading or semi-erect shrub that typically grows to a height of 0.2–1 m (7.9 in – 3 ft 3.4 in) and has leaves about 10 mm (0.39 in) long. Its are flowers very small, arranged in clusters of up to 60, surrounded by green bracts that turn red as they age, the inflorescence 20–30 mm (0.79–1.18 in) wide. Flowering occurs between August and December. The species was first formally described by Victorian Government botanist Ferdinand von Mueller in 1875 in Fragmenta Phytographiae Australiae. The specific epithet (neildiana) honours James Edward Neild. It grows among rocks in the Avon Wheatbelt, Geraldton Sandplains and Swan Coastal Plain biogeographic regions of south-western Western Australia.
