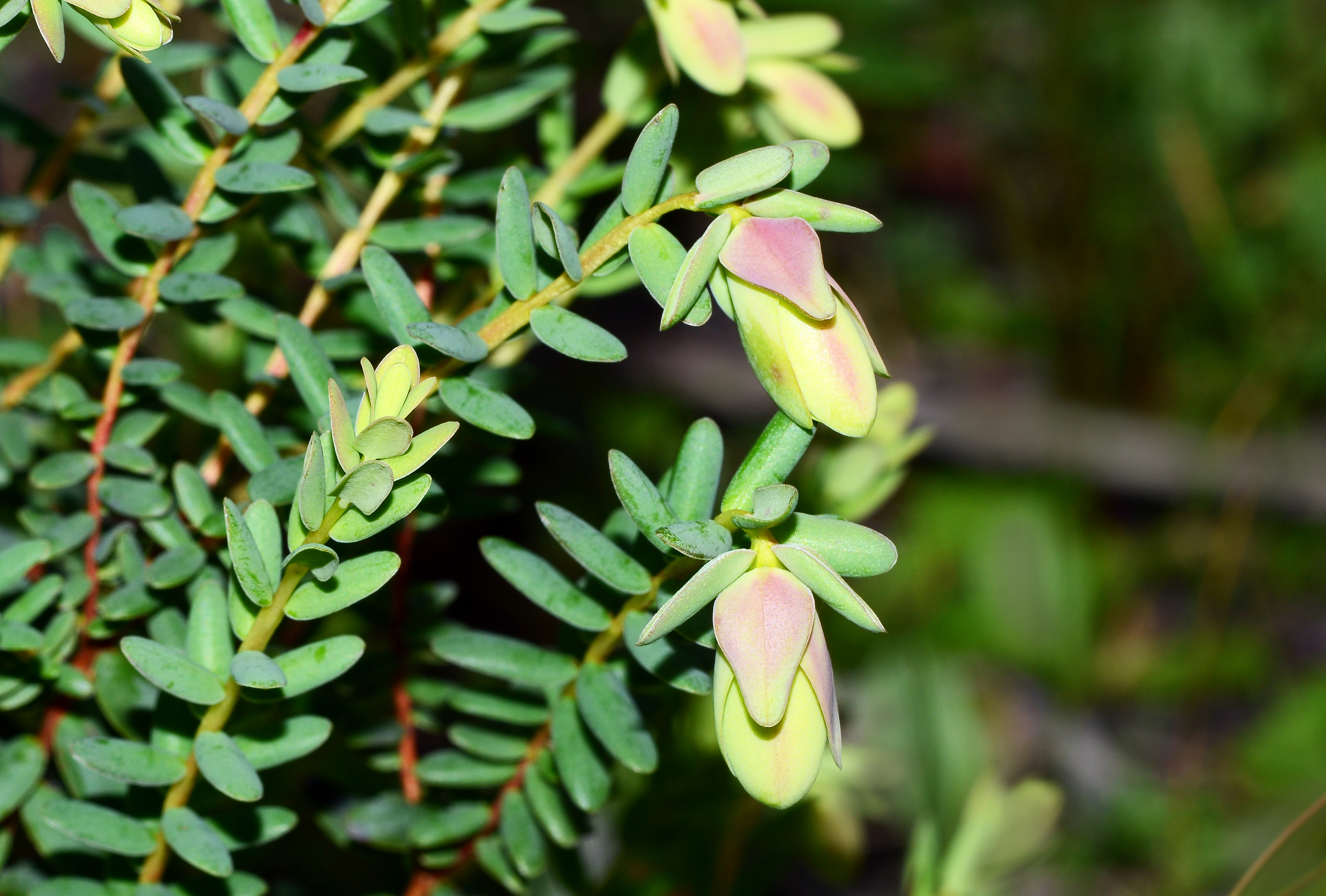

Conservation status
- Priority Four — Rare Taxa (DEC)

Scientific classification
- Kingdom: Plantae
- Clade: Tracheophytes
- Clade: Angiosperms
- Clade: Eudicots
- Clade: Rosids
- Order: Myrtales
- Family: Myrtaceae
- Genus: Darwinia
- Species: D. pimelioides

Binomial name
- Darwinia pimelioides Cayzer & F.W.Wakef.
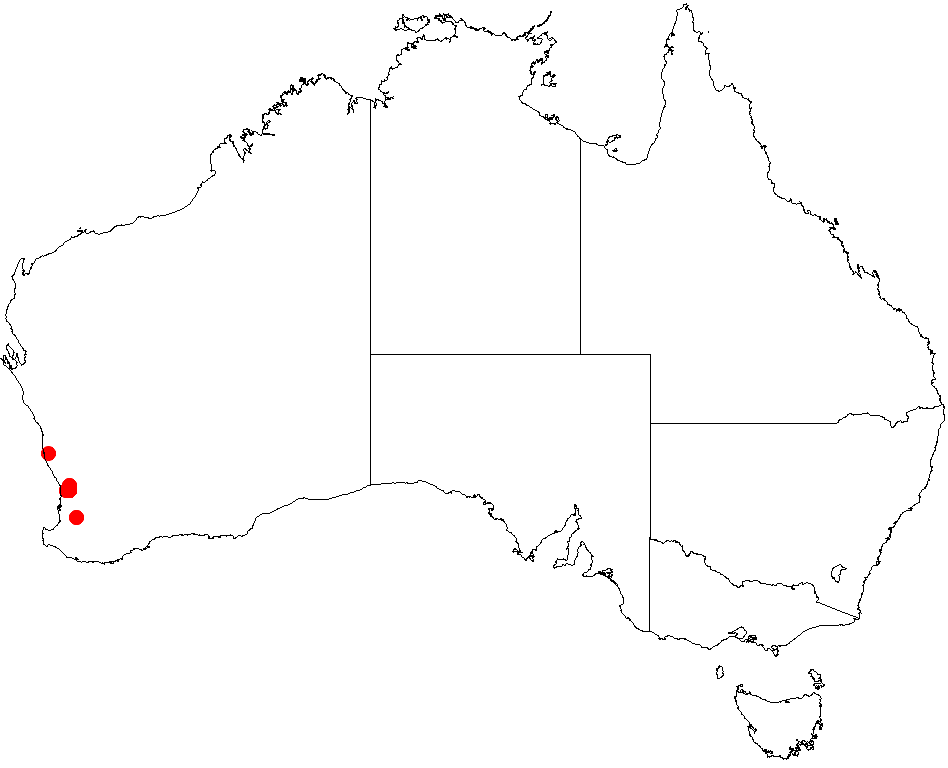
- Occurrence data from AVH

= Darwinia pimelioides =

Species of flowering plant

Darwinia pimelioides is a species of flowering plant in the family Myrtaceae and is endemic to the southwest of Western Australia. It is an erect shrub with broadly oblong leaves and heads of drooping flowers surrounded by larger red to pink and green bracts.

== Description ==
Darwinia pimelioides is an erect, glabrous shrub that typically grows to height of 25–50 cm (9.8–19.7 in) and has many slender branches. Its leaves are arranged in opposite pairs, broadly oblong and 4–6 mm (0.16–0.24 in) long with the edges curved down. The flowers are arranged in on the ends of branches in heads of 4, surrounded by about 6 green and red to pink involucral bracts about 15 mm (0.59 in) long. The sepal tube is about 4 mm (0.16 in) long with lobes less than 1 mm (0.039 in) long. The petals are egg-shaped, about 2.5 mm (0.098 in) long and the style is slightly longer than the petals. Flowering occurs in September and October.

== Taxonomy ==
Darwinia pimelioides was first formally described in 1922 by A. Cayzer and F.W. Wakefield in the Journal and Proceedings of the Royal Society of Western Australia from specimens collected near Midland Junction in 1918. The specific epithet (pimelioides) means "pimelea-like".

== Distribution and habitat ==
This darwinia grows among granite outcrops in the Jarrah Forest and Swan Coastal Plain bioregions of south-western Western Australia.

== Conservation status ==
Darwinia pimelioidesis listed as "Priority Four" by the Government of Western Australia Department of Biodiversity, Conservation and Attractions, meaning that it is rare or near threatened.
