= Darwinia nubigena =

Success bell

Conservation status
- Vulnerable (EPBC Act)

Scientific classification
- Kingdom: Plantae
- Clade: Tracheophytes
- Clade: Angiosperms
- Clade: Eudicots
- Clade: Rosids
- Order: Myrtales
- Family: Myrtaceae
- Genus: Darwinia
- Species: D. nubigena

Binomial name
- Darwinia nubigena Keighery

Species of flowering plant

Darwinia nubigena, commonly known as success bell or red mountain bell, is a species of flowering plant in the family Myrtaceae and is endemic to the south of Western Australia. It is an erect shrub with egg-shaped leaves arranged in opposite pairs, and groups of 4 or 5 pendent red flowers surrounded by larger green and red bracts.

== Description ==
Darwinia nubigena is an open, erect, straggly shrub that typically grows to a height of 0.4–1.5 m (1 ft 4 in – 4 ft 11 in) and is often supported by other shrubs. It has egg-shaped leaves arranged in opposite pairs, 4–6 mm (0.16–0.24 in) long and 2–3.3 mm (0.079–0.130 in) wide. The flowers are cylindrical and pendent, arranged in groups of 4 or 5, each flower 4.5–5.5 mm (0.18–0.22 in) long, the groups surrounded by green bracts up to 4 m (13 ft) long and 3 rows of red bracts, the longest 15 mm (0.59 in) long and 6 mm (0.24 in) wide. Flowering occurs from September to November.

== Taxonomy ==
Darwinia nubigena was first formally described in 2009 by Gregory John Keighery in the journal Nuytsia from specimens collected in the Stirling Range National Park in 1997. The specific epithet (nubigena) means "born of the clouds".

== Distribution and habitat ==
Success bell is confined to a small area on a saddle on a mountain in the centre of the eastern part of Stirling Range National Park where it grows in dense, montane mallee shrubland. There is a single population comprising around 10,000 individuals. The area was burnt in April 1991 but has regenerated strongly from seed with up to 100 seedlings per square metre.

== Conservation status ==
This darwinia is listed as "vulnerable" under the Australian Government Environment Protection and Biodiversity Conservation Act 1999 and as "Threatened" by the Western Australian Government Department of Biodiversity, Conservation and Attractions, meaning that it is in danger of extinction. The main threats to the species are inappropriate fire regimes and dieback caused by Phytophthora cinnamomi.
