= List of Chamelaucium species =

This is a list of plant species from the genus Chamelaucium.

== Species ==
- C. aorocladus
- C. axillare Benth. - Esperance waxflower
- C. brevifolium Benth.
- C. ciliatum Desf.
- C. confertiflorum Domin
- C. conostigmum
- C. croxfordiae
- C. drummondii Meisn.
- C. erythrochlorum
- C. floriferum
- C. forrestii (F.Muell.)
- C. foustinellum
- C. gracile F. Muell.
- C. griffinii
- C. halophilum
- C. hamatum
- C. heterandrum Benth.
- C. juniperinum
- C. leptocaulum
- C. lullfitzii
- C. marchantii Strid
- C. megalopetalum Benth. - Large waxflower
- C. micranthum (Turcz.) Domin
- C. naviculum
- C. oenanthum
- C. orarium
- C. pauciflorum (Turcz.) Benth.
- C. paynterae
- C. psammophilum
- C. repens
- C. roycei
- C. uncinatum Schauer - Geraldton wax
- C. virgatum Endl.

== Sources ==
- "Chamelaucium". FloraBase. Western Australian Government Department of Biodiversity, Conservation and Attractions.
