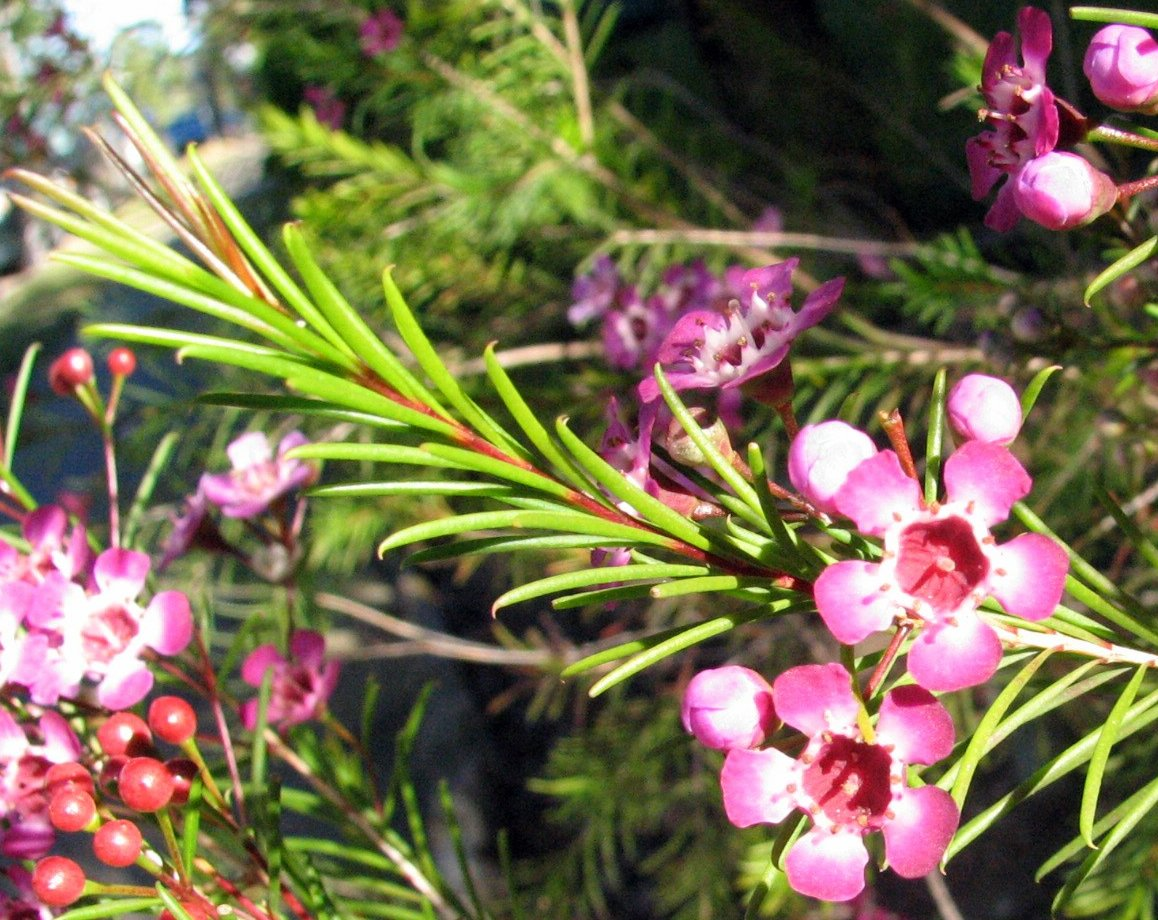
- Chamelaucium uncinatum

Scientific classification
- Kingdom: Plantae
- Clade: Tracheophytes
- Clade: Angiosperms
- Clade: Eudicots
- Clade: Rosids
- Order: Myrtales
- Family: Myrtaceae
- Subfamily: Myrtoideae
- Tribe: Chamelaucieae

Genera
- See text

= Chamelaucieae =

Tribe of flowering plants

Chamelaucieae is a tribe of flowering plants within the family Myrtaceae, mostly from Australia, with a few species in New Caledonia and south-east Asia.

Genera include:

- Actinodium Schauer (Australia)
- Aluta Rye & Trudgen (Australia)
- Anticoryne Turcz. (southwest Australia)
- Astartea DC. (Australia)
- Astus Trudgen & Rye (Australia)
- Austrobaeckea Rye (southwest Australia)
- Babingtonia Lindl. (Australia)
- Baeckea L (Australia, South-East Asia)
- Balaustion Hook. (Australia)
- Calytrix Labill. (Australia)
- Chamelaucium Desf. (Australia)
- Corynanthera J.W.Green (Australia)
- Cyathostemon Turcz. (Australia)
- Darwinia Rudge (Australia)
- Enekbatus Trudgen & Rye (Australia)
- Ericomyrtus Turcz. (Australia)
- Euryomyrtus Schauer (Australia)
- Harmogia Schauer (Australia)
- Homalocalyx F. Muell. (Australia)
- Homoranthus A. Cunn. ex Schauer (Australia)
- Hypocalymma (Endl.) Endl. (Australia)
- Hysterobaeckea (Nied.) Rye (Australia)
- Kardomia Peter G.Wilson (Australia)
- Malleostemon J.W.Green (Australia)
- Micromyrtus Benth. (Australia)
- Ochrosperma Trudgen (Australia)
- Oxymyrrhine Schauer (southwest Australia)
- Pileanthus Labill. (Australia)
- Rinzia Schauer (Australia)
- Sannantha Peter G.Wilson (Australia, New Caledonia)
- Scholtzia Schauer (Australia)
- Stenostegia A.R. Bean (Australia)
- Tetrapora Schauer (southwest Australia)
- Thryptomene Endl. (Australia)
- Triplarina Raf. (Australia)
- Verticordia DC. (Australia)
