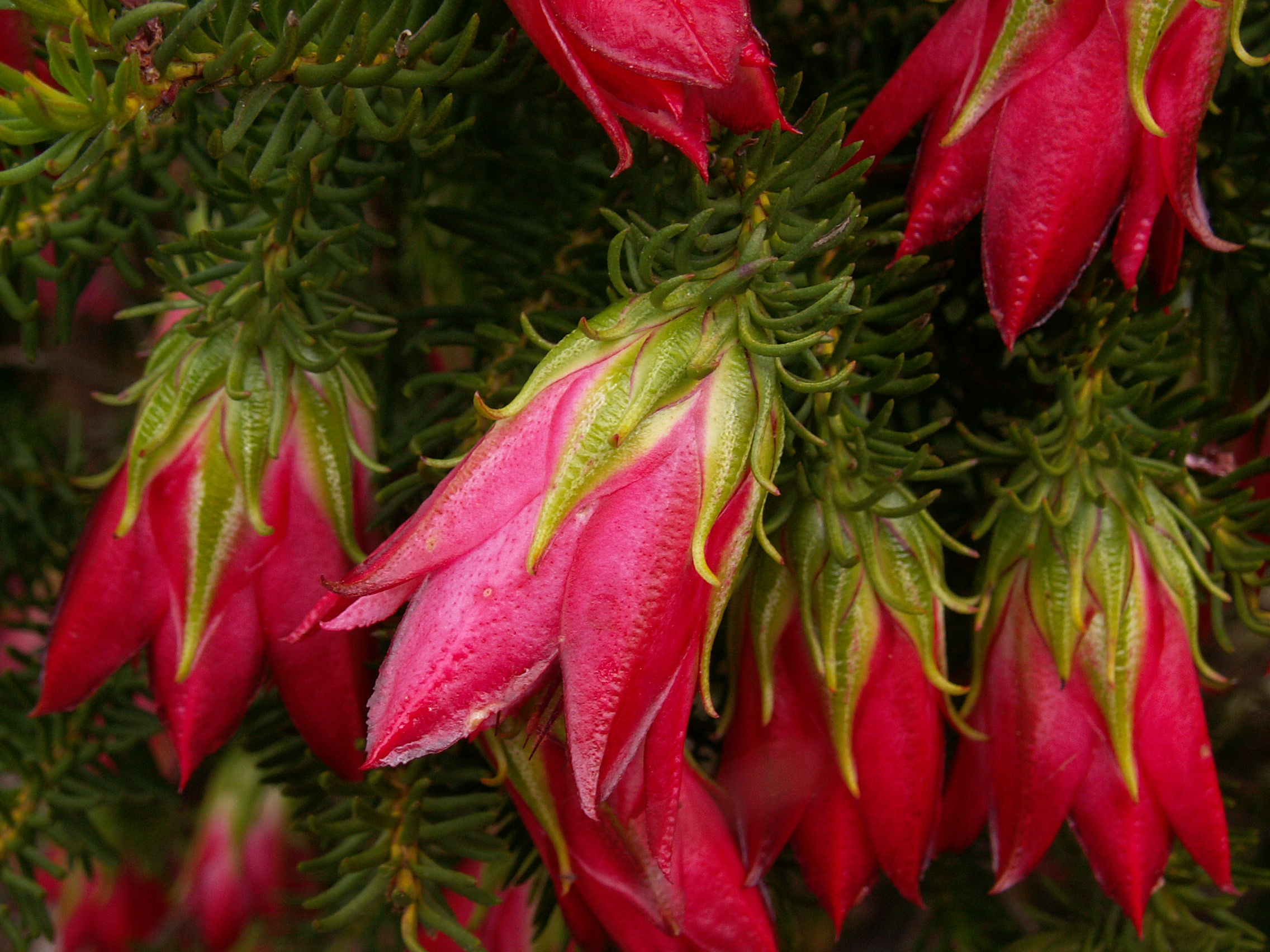
- In Cranbrook wildflower garden, Cranbrook, Western Australia.

Conservation status
- Endangered (EPBC Act)

Scientific classification
- Kingdom: Plantae
- Clade: Tracheophytes
- Clade: Angiosperms
- Clade: Eudicots
- Clade: Rosids
- Order: Myrtales
- Family: Myrtaceae
- Genus: Darwinia
- Species: D. oxylepis

Binomial name
- Darwinia oxylepis (Turcz.) N.G.Marchant & Keighery
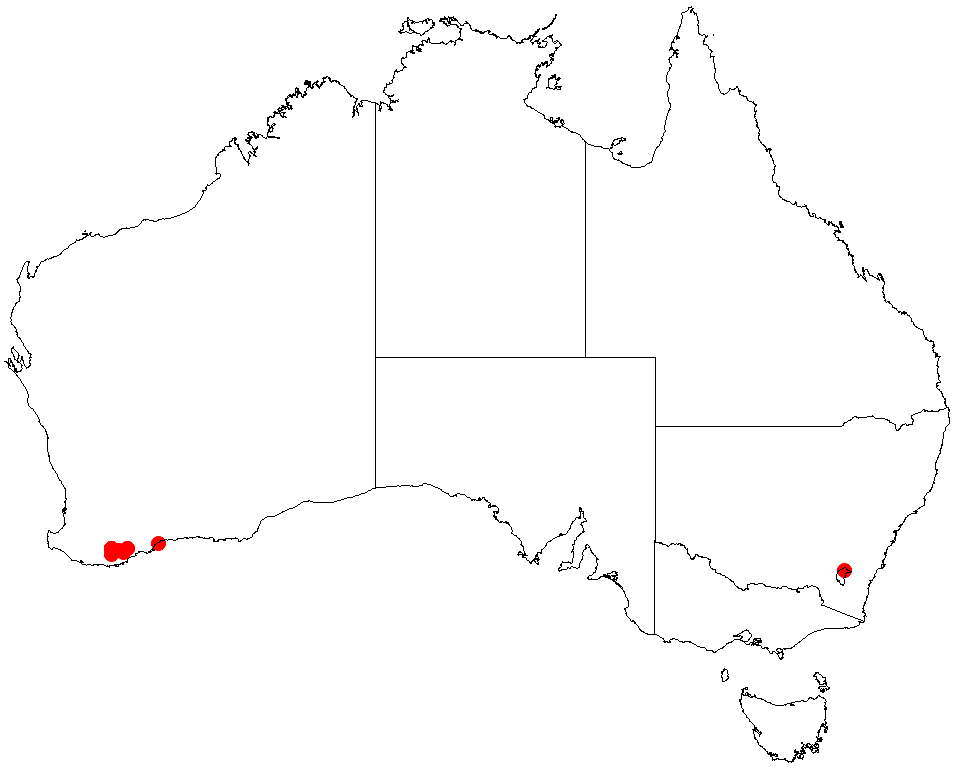
- Occurrence data from AVH

Synonyms
- Darwinia leiostyla subsp. 'Mondurup'; Darwinia meisneri (Kippist) Benth.; Darwinia meissneri Benth orth. var.; Genetyllis meisneri Kippist p.p.; Genetyllis oxylepis Turcz.

= Darwinia oxylepis =

Gillham's bell

Species of flowering plant

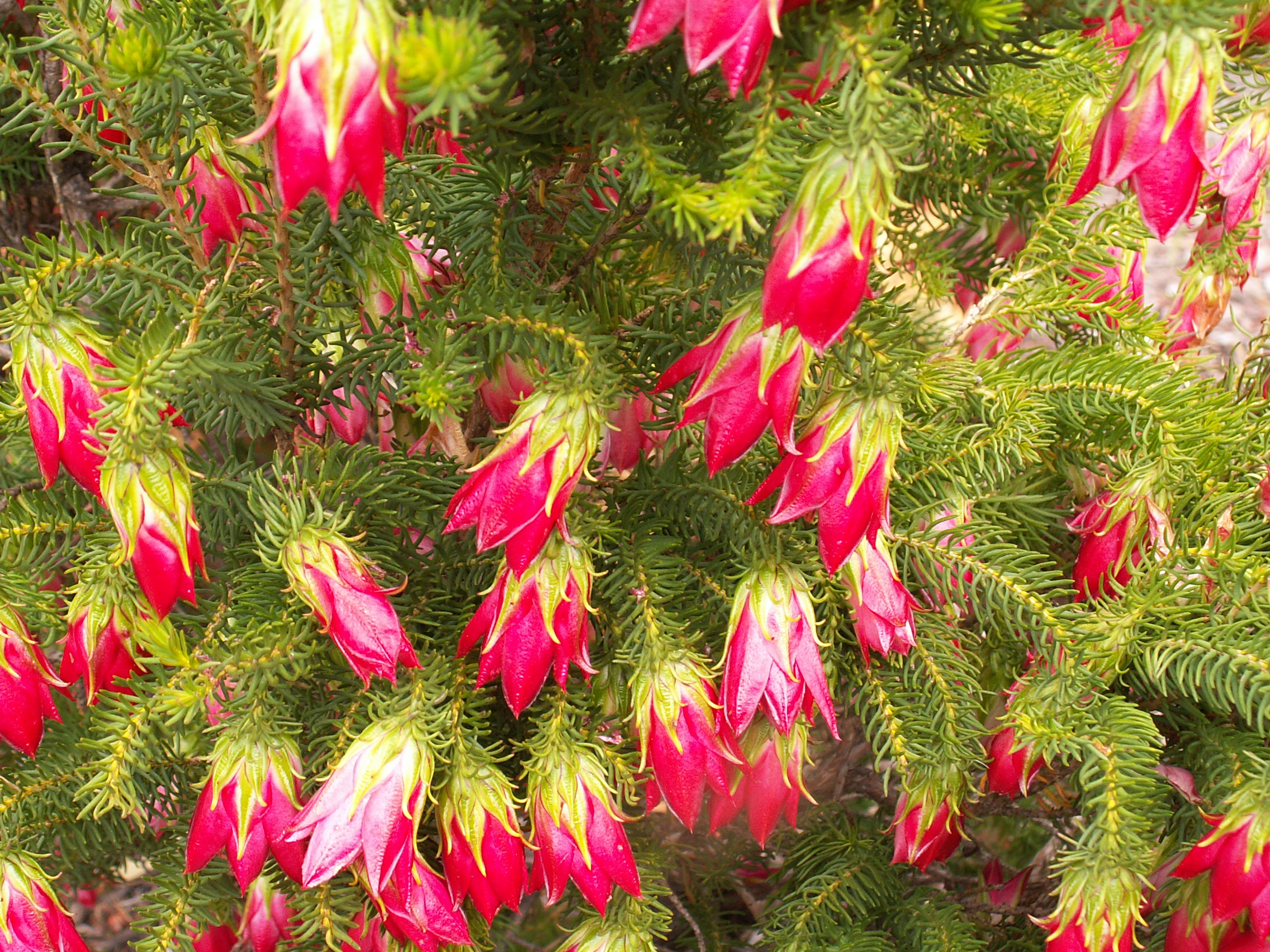

Darwinia oxylepis, commonly known as Gillham's bell, is a plant in the myrtle family Myrtaceae. It grows as a dense, upright shrub 1.0–1.5 m (3.3–4.9 ft) high, and produces large numbers of red inflorescences prominently displayed on the ends of the branchlets in spring. It is one of a group of Darwinias including D. leiostyla, D. macrostegia, D. meeboldii, D. collina and D. squarrosa collectively known as mountain bells. The species is found in only a few seasonally moist gullies near the lower slopes of the Stirling Range National Park and nearby Porongurup National Park and is therefore classified as endangered.

== Description ==
Gillham's bell is a small, dense, upright shrub to about 1.5 metres high, with erect branches and short branchlets. Its leaves are about 10 mm long by about 1 mm wide and are almost cylindrical or triangular in cross section. Bell-shaped, flower-like inflorescences appear from August to November. These are clusters of about 10 drooping, nectar-rich flowers surrounded by bright red petal-like bracts up to 30 mm long.

== Taxonomy and naming ==
Darwinia oxylepis is one of about 70 species of Darwinia endemic to Australia, the majority being endemic to southern Western Australia. This species was originally described in 1852 by Nikolai Turczaninow who gave it the name Genetyllis lejostyla. In 1923 it was transferred to the Darwinia genus by Karel Domin, who gave it the name Darwinia leiostyla. In 1980, Neville Marchant and Greg Keighery recognised D. lejostyla and D. oxylepis as separate species, so that it is now known as Darwinia oxylepis.

The specific epithet (oxylepis) is derived from the Greek words oxys meaning "sharp" and lepis meaning "flake" or "scale", referring to the shape of the bracts enclosing the flowers.

== Distribution and habitat ==
This darwinia grows in stony, peaty sand in rocky gullies that are wet in winter. There are only four known populations of D. oxylepis, all of them in national parks (Stirling Range and Porongurup). They grow in areas known to be significantly affected by Phytophthora cinnamomi fungus to which they are vulnerable. They are also in areas that are prone to bushfire. The species is killed by fire and regenerates from seed stored in the soil but it takes up to four years before new plants produce seed. More frequent fire events may therefore cause loss of populations. The plants also grow in areas frequented by tourists and are at risk from trampling and unauthorised picking of plant parts.

== Conservation status ==
Darwinia oxylepis is listed as "endangered" under the Australian Government Environment Protection and Biodiversity Conservation Act 1999. It is also classified as "Threatened Flora (Declared Rare Flora — Extant)" by the Department of Environment and Conservation (Western Australia) and an interim recovery plan has been prepared.

In October 2000, a total of about 4,000 plants were counted in all four areas, but after a bushfire later that month, there were none.

== Propagation ==
As with others in the genus, D. oxylepis is not well known in cultivation. It is difficult to grow from seed but relatively easy to grow from cuttings, although generally short-lived in the garden. It has been grafted onto the hardier eastern Australian D. citriodora, and this is the preferred method of propagation.
