= Austrobaeckea =

Scientific classification
- Kingdom: Plantae
- Clade: Tracheophytes
- Clade: Angiosperms
- Clade: Eudicots
- Clade: Rosids
- Order: Myrtales
- Family: Myrtaceae
- Subfamily: Myrtoideae
- Tribe: Chamelaucieae
- Genus: Austrobaeckea; Rye (2021)

Type species
- Austrobaeckea verrucosa (Turcz.) Rye (2021)

Genus of plants

Austrobaeckea is a genus of plants in the myrtle family (Myrtaceae). It contains eight species which are native to Southwest Australia.

Species of the genus are native to the southern coastal region of Southwest Australia, from Walpole in the west to Israelite Bay in the east. Similarly to other genera in the tribe Chamelaucieae, Austrobaecka has small seeds.

The genus was described in 2021 by Barbara L. Rye. Five species were formerly classed in the genera Baeckea and Tetrapora, and three new species were described in 2021 along with the genus.

== Description ==
Austrobaeckea species are small or medium sized shrubs, and may be single-stemmed or multi-branched at the base, galls common on or within young stems. Leaves are small; about as thick as they are wide, but differ in the species. Most species have fewer than five peduncles per flowering branchlet, but A. verrucosa may have up to 9. Petals are white in all species.

Differentiation of the species relies on leaf morphology and clustering, notably the petiole length, leaf thickness, curvature of the adaxial surface, and length of the apical point when present.

Seeds of Austrobaeckea species are small, becoming dark red-brown as they mature.

== Species ==
Eight species are currently accepted:

- Austrobaeckea columnaris Rye
- Austrobaeckea fascifolia Rye
- Austrobaeckea latens (C.R.P.Andrews) Rye
- Austrobaeckea narembeen Rye
- Austrobaeckea pachyphylla (Benth.) Rye
- Austrobaeckea pygmaea (R.Br. ex Benth.) Rye
- Austrobaeckea uncinella (Benth.) Rye
- Austrobaeckea verrucosa (Turcz.) Rye
