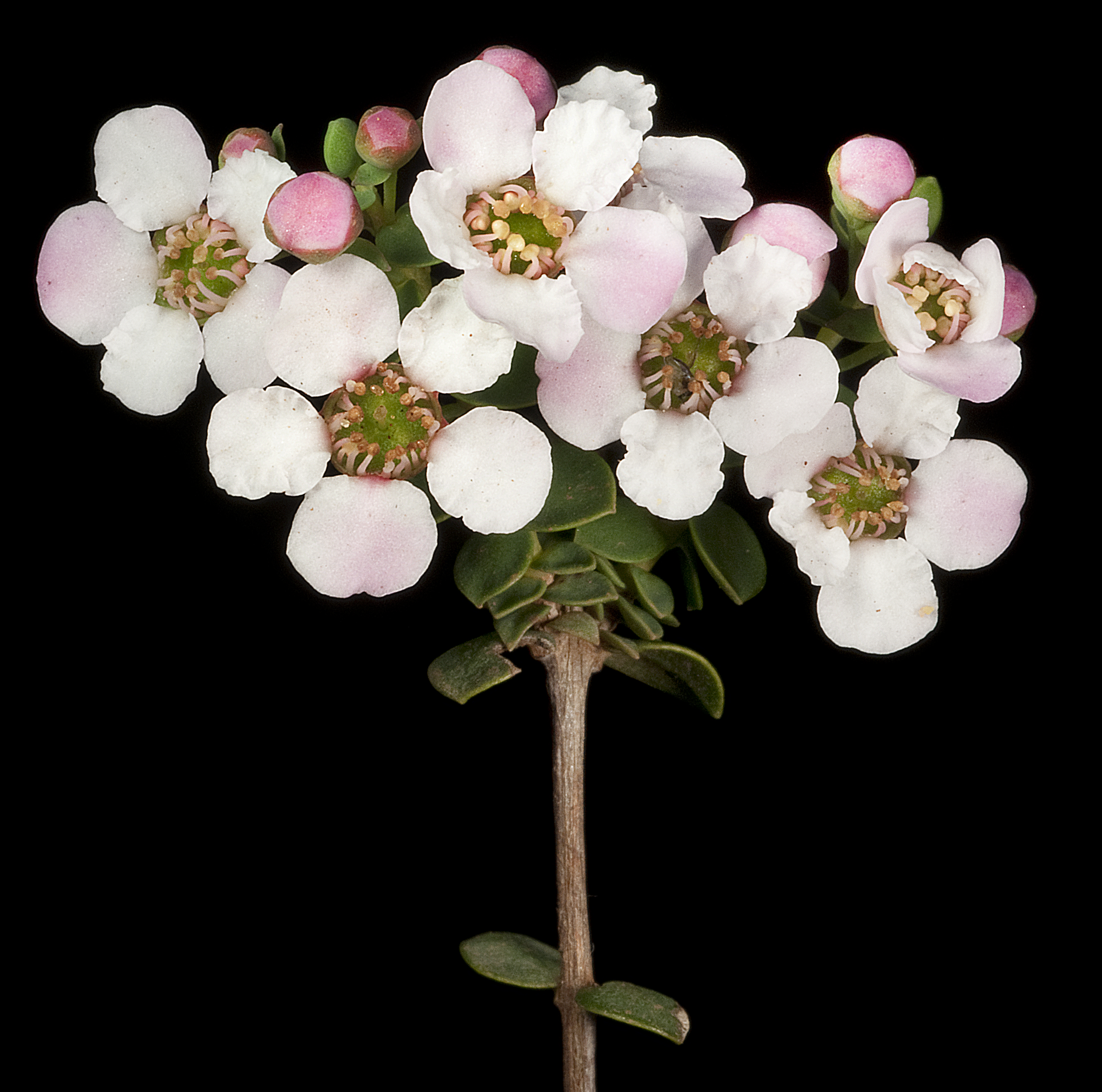

Scientific classification
- Kingdom: Plantae
- Clade: Tracheophytes
- Clade: Angiosperms
- Clade: Eudicots
- Clade: Rosids
- Order: Myrtales
- Family: Myrtaceae
- Genus: Ericomyrtus
- Species: E. tenuior

Binomial name
- Ericomyrtus tenuior (Ewart) Rye

= Ericomyrtus tenuior =

Species of flowering plant

Ericomyrtus tenuior is a shrub endemic to Western Australia.
