= Darwinia citriodora =

Lemon-scented darwinia
- Darwinia citriodora foliage and flowers

Scientific classification
- Kingdom: Plantae
- Clade: Tracheophytes
- Clade: Angiosperms
- Clade: Eudicots
- Clade: Rosids
- Order: Myrtales
- Family: Myrtaceae
- Genus: Darwinia
- Species: D. citriodora

Binomial name
- Darwinia citriodora (Endl.) Benth.
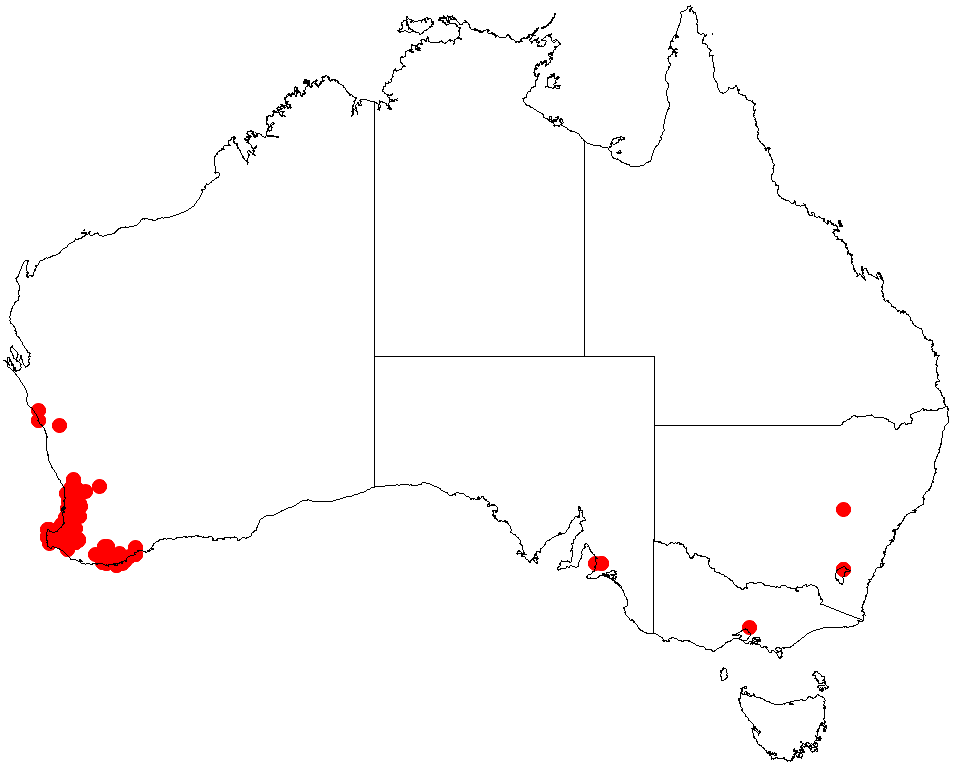
- Occurrence data from AVH

Synonyms
- Genetyllis citriodora Endl.; Genetyllis pimelioides F.Muell.; Genetyllis pimeloides F.Muell. orth. var.; Hedaroma latifolium Lindl.

Species of flowering plant

Darwinia citriodora, commonly known as lemon-scented darwinia or lemon scented myrtle, is a plant in the myrtle family Myrtaceae and is endemic to the south-west of Western Australia. It is a shrub with oblong to lance-shaped leaves and red, yellow and orange flowers over an extended period. It is a hardy plant in well-drained soil, is often cultivated and used as a rootstock for less hardy species.

== Description ==
Darwinia citriodora is a compact shrub which grows to a height and width of 1–1.5 metres (3–5 ft). The leaves are arranged in opposite pairs along the stems, 6–12 millimetres (0.2–0.5 in) long, lance-shaped to oval with a blunt tip and with their edges rolled under. They are usually a rich green colour but often turn purplish during winter. The leaves have obvious oil glands on their lower surface and have a pleasant lemon scent when crushed. The flowers are arranged in groups of four near the ends of the branches, each group surrounded by reddish-green, leaf-like bracts. Individual flowers are small, tube-shaped and yellow with the petals enclosing the stamens. The style is about 10 millimetres (0.4 in) long, red to yellow and extends beyond the flower, with its brush-like tip curving towards the centre of the group of flowers. Flowering occurs between May and December.

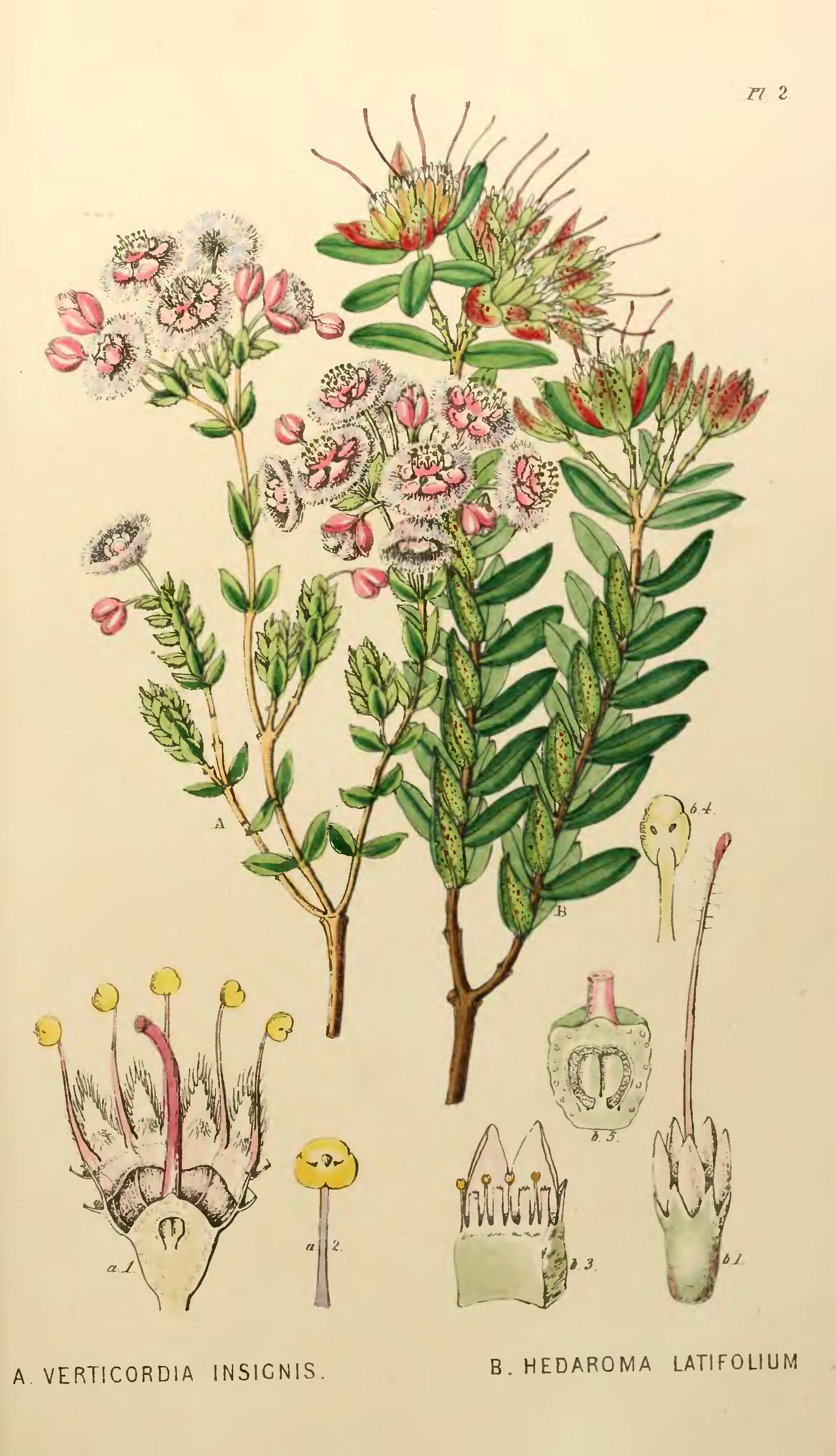
Plate 2 from A Sketch of the Vegetation of the Swan River Colony; Hedaroma latifolium (now D. citriodora) is on the right.

== Taxonomy ==
This species was first formally described in 1837 by Stefan Endlicher who gave it the name Genetyllis citriodora. The description was published in Enumeratio plantarum quas in Novae Hollandiæ ora austro-occidentali ad fluvium Cygnorum et in sinu Regis Georgii collegit Carolus Liber Baro de Hügel. In 1865, George Bentham changed the name to Darwinia citriodora and published the change in Journal of the Linnean Society, Botany. The specific epithet (citriodora) is derived from the Latin words citrea meaning "lemon" and odora meaning "smell" or "scent".

== Distribution and habitat ==
Lemon-scented darwinia occurs in near-coastal areas between the Swan River and Cape Riche in the Esperance Plain, Jarrah Forest, Swan Coastal Plain and Warren biogeographic regions where in grows in lateritic or granitic soils.

== Use in horticulture ==
Darwinia citriodora has been available in nurseries for many years and a variety with larger than normal flowers has been produced. It is easily propagated from cuttings which are best obtained at the end of summer or early autumn. It is valuable as a rootstock for other species, especially those from the genera Verticordia, Chamelaucium and Actinodium as well as for other species of Darwinia.

== Conservation ==
Darwinia citriodora is listed as "not threatened" by the Government of Western Australia Department of Parks and Wildlife.

== Gallery ==
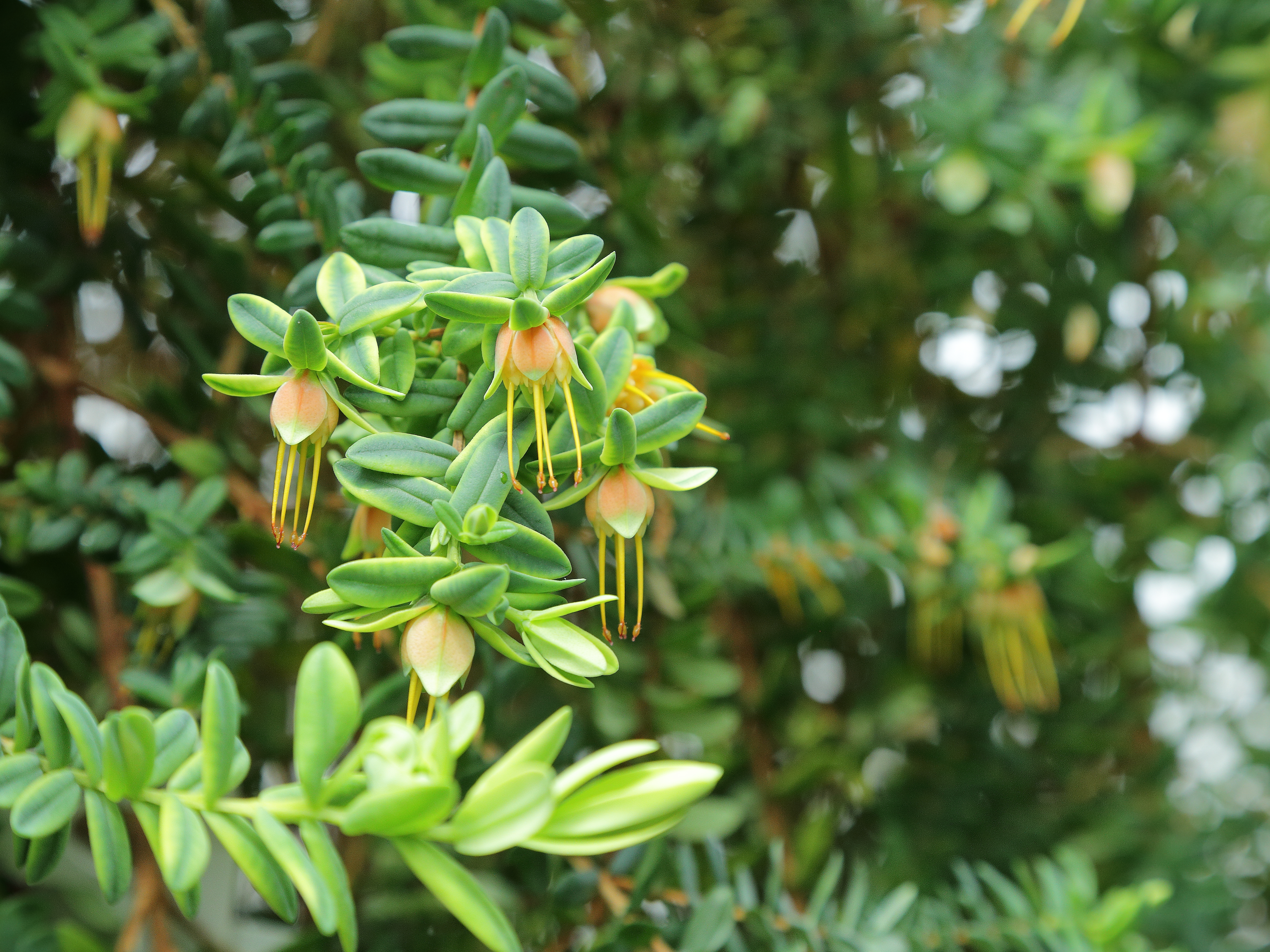

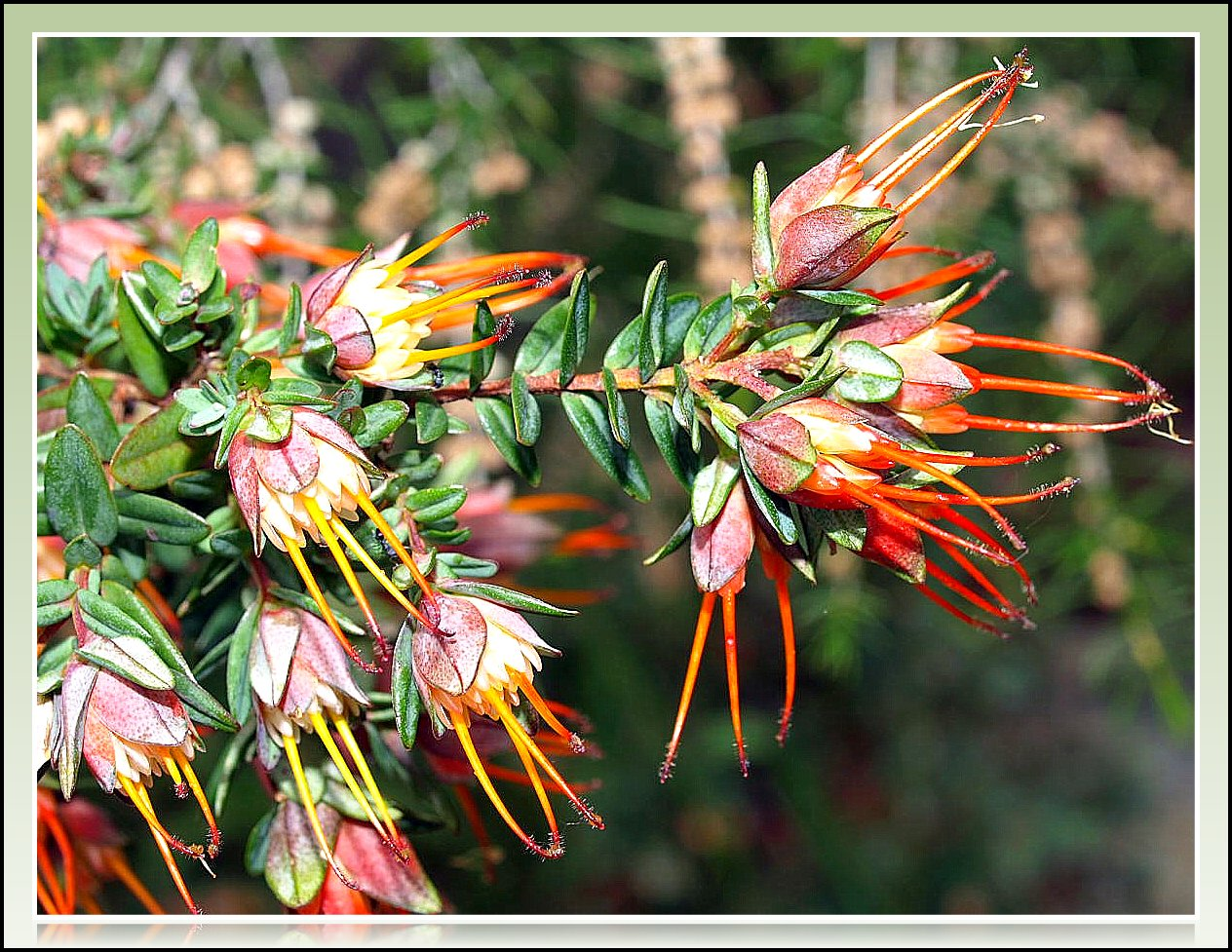
