= Austrobaeckea pachyphylla =

Scientific classification
- Kingdom: Plantae
- Clade: Tracheophytes
- Clade: Angiosperms
- Clade: Eudicots
- Clade: Rosids
- Order: Myrtales
- Family: Myrtaceae
- Genus: Austrobaeckea
- Species: A. pachyphylla

Binomial name
- Austrobaeckea pachyphylla (Benth.) Rye

Synonyms
- Baeckea pachyphylla Benth.

Species of flowering plant

Austrobaeckea pachyphylla is a species of flowering plant in the family Myrtaceae and is endemic to the south of Western Australia. It is a shrub with bilaterally flattened leaves and small white flowers with two to eight stamens.

== Description ==
Austrobaeckea pachyphylla grows as a shrub, typically 0.4–1.5 m (1 ft 4 in – 4 ft 11 in) high and 0.3–1.2 m (1 ft 0 in – 3 ft 11 in) wide. Its leaves are bilaterally flattened, egg-shaped with the narrower end towards the base in side view, 2.5–4.5 mm (0.098–0.177 in) long, 0.7–1.1 mm (0.028–0.043 in) wide and 0.8–1.3 mm (0.031–0.051 in) thick on a petiole 0.3–0.6 mm (0.012–0.024 in) long. The flowers are 5.0–7.5 mm (0.20–0.30 in) in diameter and are mostly borne singly on a peduncle 0.4–1.2 mm (0.016–0.047 in) long or on pedicels 1.5–3.3 mm (0.059–0.130 in) long when in groups of up to three. The sepals are broadly egg-shaped, 0.6–1.1 mm (0.024–0.043 in) long and the petals are white, 2.2–3.5 mm (0.087–0.138 in) long. There are two to eight stamens, the ovary has three locules and the style is 0.8–1.3 mm (0.031–0.051 in) long. Flowering mainly occurs from September to December and the fruit is a capsule 1.5–1.7 mm (0.059–0.067 in) long with a pitted surface.

== Taxonomy ==
This species was first formally described in 1867 by George Bentham who gave it the name Baeckea pachyphylla in his Flora Australiensis from specimens collected by George Maxwell. In 2021, Barbara Lynette Rye transferred the species to Austrobaeckea in the journal Nuytsia. The specific epithet (pachyphylla) means "thick-leaved".

== Distribution and habitat ==
Austrobaeckea pachyphylla is found on sand plains and gentle slopes, often with mallees, in the Esperance Plains and Mallee bioregions of southern Western Australia where it grows in sandy, clay and loamy soils around granite.
