= Austrobaeckea latens =

Scientific classification
- Kingdom: Plantae
- Clade: Tracheophytes
- Clade: Angiosperms
- Clade: Eudicots
- Clade: Rosids
- Order: Myrtales
- Family: Myrtaceae
- Genus: Austrobaeckea
- Species: A. latens

Binomial name
- Austrobaeckea latens (C.R.P.Andrews) Rye

Synonyms
- Baeckea latens C.R.P.Andrews

Species of flowering plant

Austrobaeckea latens is a species of flowering plant in the family Myrtaceae and is endemic to the south of Western Australia. It is an upright, spreading shrub with erect, linear leaves and small white flowers with three to ten stamens.

== Description ==
Austrobaeckea latens is an upright, spreading shrub typically 0.3–1.8 m (1 ft 0 in – 5 ft 11 in) high and 0.4–1.5 m (1 ft 4 in – 4 ft 11 in) wide. The leaves are mostly erect, narrow egg-shaped with the narrower end towards the base, or linear, 4.5–8.5 mm (0.18–0.33 in) long and 0.5–0.7 mm (0.020–0.028 in) wide on a petiole 0.5–0.8 mm (0.020–0.031 in) long. The flowers are 6.5–9 mm (0.26–0.35 in) in diameter and are borne singly on a pedicel 0.5–0.8 mm (0.020–0.031 in) long or in groups of up to three on pedicels 1.5–6 mm (0.059–0.236 in) long. The sepals are egg-shaped, 0.8–1.3 mm (0.031–0.051 in) long and the petals are white, 2.5–3.5 mm (0.098–0.138 in) long. There are three to ten stamens arranged opposite the sepals. The ovary has three locules and the style is 1.3–1.8 mm (0.051–0.071 in) long. Flowering occurs from October to December and the fruit is a capsule 1.5–2.2 mm (0.059–0.087 in) long.

== Taxonomy ==
This species was first formally described in 1904 by Cecil Rollo Payton Andrews who gave it the name Baeckea latens in the Journal of the West Australian Natural History Society from a small fragment collected north of Esperance in October 1903. In 2021, Barbara Lynette Rye transferred the species to the genus Austrobaeckea as A. latens.

== Distribution and habitat ==
Austrobaeckea latens grows in a range of habitats with mallees, on undulating plains and hills and in winter-wet places from near Kukerin to the Cape Arid National Park in the Esperance Plains and Mallee biogeographic regions of southern Western Australia.

== Conservation status ==
Austrobaeckea latens is listed as "not threatened" by the Government of Western Australia Department of Biodiversity, Conservation and Attractions.
