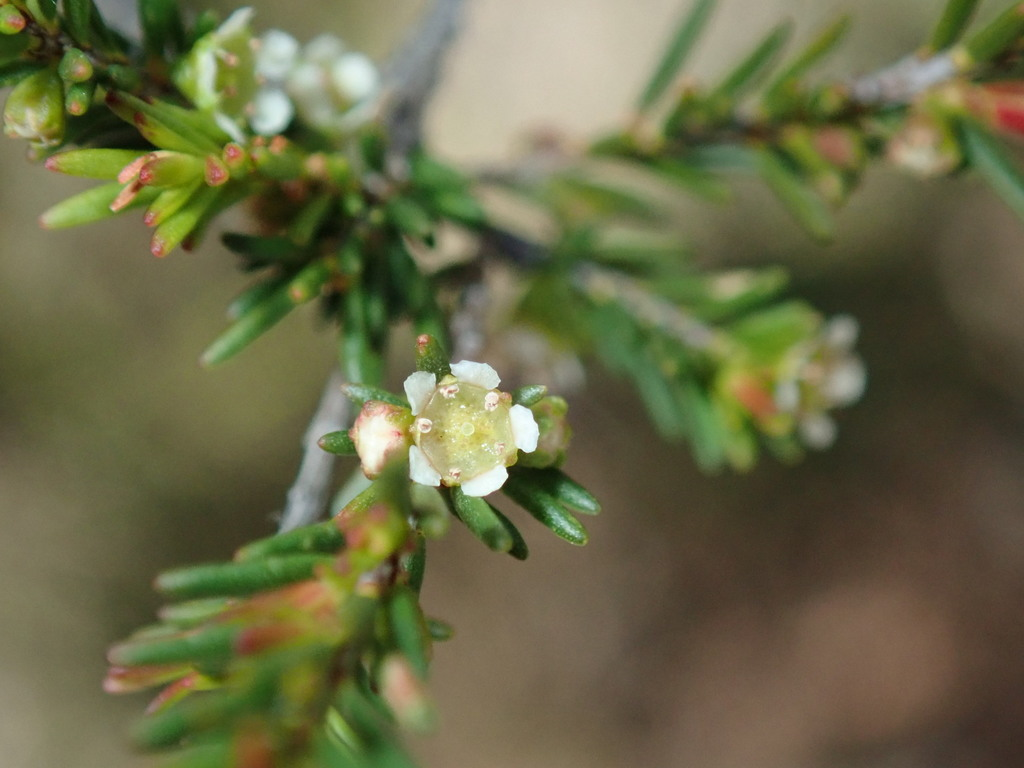
- Ochrosperma lineare

Scientific classification
- Kingdom: Plantae
- Clade: Tracheophytes
- Clade: Angiosperms
- Clade: Eudicots
- Clade: Rosids
- Order: Myrtales
- Family: Myrtaceae
- Subfamily: Myrtoideae
- Tribe: Chamelaucieae
- Genus: Ochrosperma; Trudgen

Synonyms
- Baeckea sect. Pausomyrtus Radlk.

= Ochrosperma =

Genus of shrubs

Ochrosperma is a group of shrubs and small trees in the myrtle family Myrtaceae described as a genus in 1987. The genus is endemic to Australia.

Species

- Ochrosperma adpressum A.R.Bean – Queensland
- Ochrosperma citriodorum (Penfold & J.L.Willis) Trudgen – New South Wales
- Ochrosperma lineare (C.T.White) Trudgen – Queensland, New South Wales
- Ochrosperma obovatum A.R.Bean – Queensland
- Ochrosperma oligomerum (Radlk.) A.R.Bean – New South Wales
- Ochrosperma sulcatum A.R.Bean - Northern Territory
