= Anticoryne ovalifolia =

Scientific classification
- Kingdom: Plantae
- Clade: Tracheophytes
- Clade: Angiosperms
- Clade: Eudicots
- Clade: Rosids
- Order: Myrtales
- Family: Myrtaceae
- Genus: Anticoryne
- Species: A. ovalifolia

Binomial name
- Anticoryne ovalifolia (F.Muell.) Rye

Synonyms
- Babingtonia ovalifolia (F.Muell.) F.Muell.; Baeckea ovalifolia (F.Muell.) F.Muell.; Harmogia ovalifolia F.Muell.

Species of flowering plant

Anticoryne ovalifolia is a common heathland shrub found in coastal areas of Western Australia.

The erect shrub typically grows to a height of between 0.5 to 2 metres (2 to 7 ft) and has linear oblong to ovate shaped leaves that are 3 to 6 millimetres (0.12 to 0.24 in) in length. It blooms from May and November producing pink-white flowers that have a diameter of approximately 15 mm (0.59 in).

It is often found on rocky slopes growing in sandy soils among quartzite or granite in a small area along the south coast of Western Australia.

The species was first formally described in 1860 by Ferdinand von Mueller who gave it the name Harmogia ovalifolia in his Fragmenta Phytographiae Australiae. In 1864, von Mueller changed the name to the Baeckea ovalifolia and in 2012, Barbara Lynette Rye changed the name to Anticoryne ovalifolia in the journal Nuytsia.
