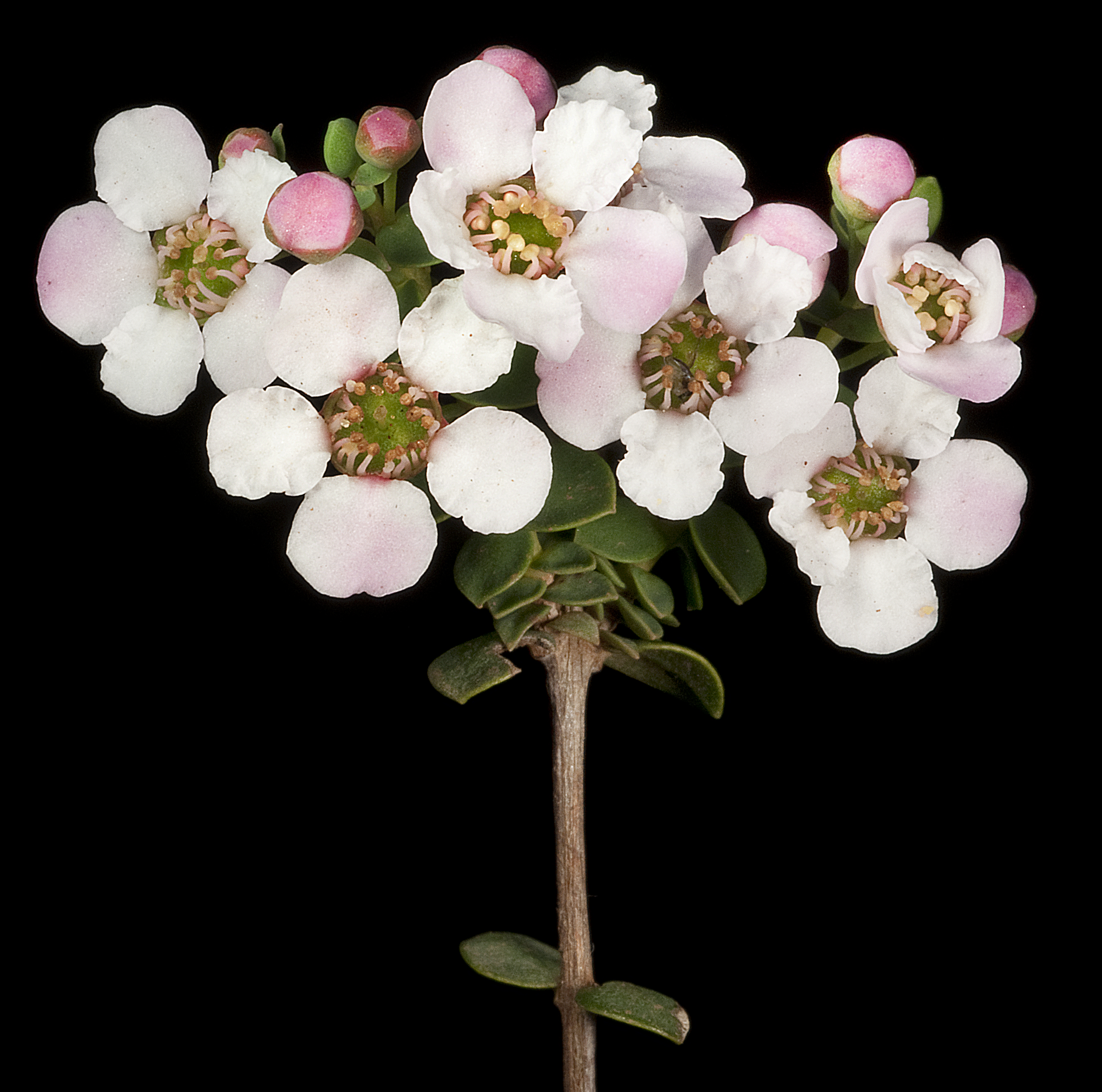
- Ericomyrtus tenuior

Scientific classification
- Kingdom: Plantae
- Clade: Tracheophytes
- Clade: Angiosperms
- Clade: Eudicots
- Clade: Rosids
- Order: Myrtales
- Family: Myrtaceae
- Subfamily: Myrtoideae
- Tribe: Chamelaucieae
- Genus: Ericomyrtus; Turcz.

Species
- See text

= Ericomyrtus =

Genus of flowering plants

Ericomyrtus is a genus of shrubs, in the family Myrtaceae, all of which are endemic to Australia.

Species include:

- Ericomyrtus drummondii Turcz.
- Ericomyrtus parviflora (Turcz.) Rye
- Ericomyrtus serpyllifolia (Turcz.) Rye
- Ericomyrtus tenuior (Ewert) Rye

== Distribution ==
Species within this genus are found in the south west of Western Australia.
