= Austrobaeckea uncinella =

Conservation status
- Priority Three — Poorly Known Taxa (DEC)

Scientific classification
- Kingdom: Plantae
- Clade: Tracheophytes
- Clade: Angiosperms
- Clade: Eudicots
- Clade: Rosids
- Order: Myrtales
- Family: Myrtaceae
- Genus: Austrobaeckea
- Species: A. uncinella

Binomial name
- Austrobaeckea uncinella (Benth.) Rye

Synonyms
- Baeckea uncinella Benth.

Species of flowering plant

Austrobaeckea uncinella is a species of flowering plant in the family Myrtaceae and is endemic to the south coast of Western Australia. It is a shrub with narrowly egg-shaped to linear leaves and small white flowers with seven to thirteen stamens.

== Description ==
Austrobaeckea uncinella is a shrub typically 1–2 m (3 ft 3 in – 6 ft 7 in) high and 0.4–1.5 m (1 ft 4 in – 4 ft 11 in) wide with a single stem at the base. The leaves are narrowly egg-shaped with the narrower end towards the base, or linear, 3.5–6.5 mm (0.14–0.26 in) long and 0.5–1.1 mm (0.020–0.043 in) wide on a petiole 0.5–1 mm (0.020–0.039 in) long. The flowers are 5–8 mm (0.20–0.31 in) in diameter and are borne in groups of up to nine on a peduncle 2.5–6.5 mm (0.098–0.256 in) long, each flower on a pedicel 2.5–4.5 mm (0.098–0.177 in) long. The sepals are broadly egg-shaped, 0.5–1.1 mm (0.020–0.043 in) long, the petals white and 2–3 mm (0.079–0.118 in) long, and there are seven to thirteen stamens. The ovary has three locules and the style is 0.8–1 mm (0.031–0.039 in) long. Flowering occurs from October to November and the fruit is a capsule 1.3–1.5 mm (0.051–0.059 in) long.

== Taxonomy ==
This species was first formally described in 1867 by George Bentham who gave it the name Baeckea uncinella in Flora Australiensis from specimens collected by George Maxwell east of Stokes Inlet. In 2021, Barbara Lynette Rye transferred the species to the genus Austrobaeckea as A. uncinella.

== Distribution and habitat ==
Austrobaeckea uncinella grows near watercourses and salt lakes between the Young River and Mount Heywood north of Esperance, in the Esperance Plains and Mallee biogeographic regions of southern Western Australia.

== Conservation status ==
Austrobaeckea uncinella is classified as "Priority Three" by the Government of Western Australia Department of Biodiversity, Conservation and Attractions, meaning that it is poorly known and known from only a few locations but is not under imminent threat.
