= Hysterobaeckea =

Scientific classification
- Kingdom: Plantae
- Clade: Tracheophytes
- Clade: Angiosperms
- Clade: Eudicots
- Clade: Rosids
- Order: Myrtales
- Family: Myrtaceae
- Subfamily: Myrtoideae
- Tribe: Chamelaucieae
- Genus: Hysterobaeckea (Nied.) Rye (2015)

Genus of plants

Hysterobaekea is a genus of flowering plants in the myrtle family (Myrtaceae). The genus is endemic to Australia, and includes 11 species found in the states of Western Australia, South Australia, and Victoria.

== Species ==
11 species are currently accepted:

- Hysterobaeckea behrii (Schltdl.) Rye – Victoria
- Hysterobaeckea cornuta Rye – Western Australia
- Hysterobaeckea glandulosa Rye – Western Australia
- Hysterobaeckea graniticola Rye – Western Australia
- Hysterobaeckea longipes Rye – Western Australia
- Hysterobaeckea occlusa Rye – Western Australia
- Hysterobaeckea ochropetala (F.Muell.) Rye – Southwest Australia
- Hysterobaeckea petraea Rye – Western Australia
- Hysterobaeckea pterocera Rye – Western Australia
- Hysterobaeckea setifera Rye – Western Australia
- Hysterobaeckea tuberculata (Trudgen) Rye – northwestern South Australia
