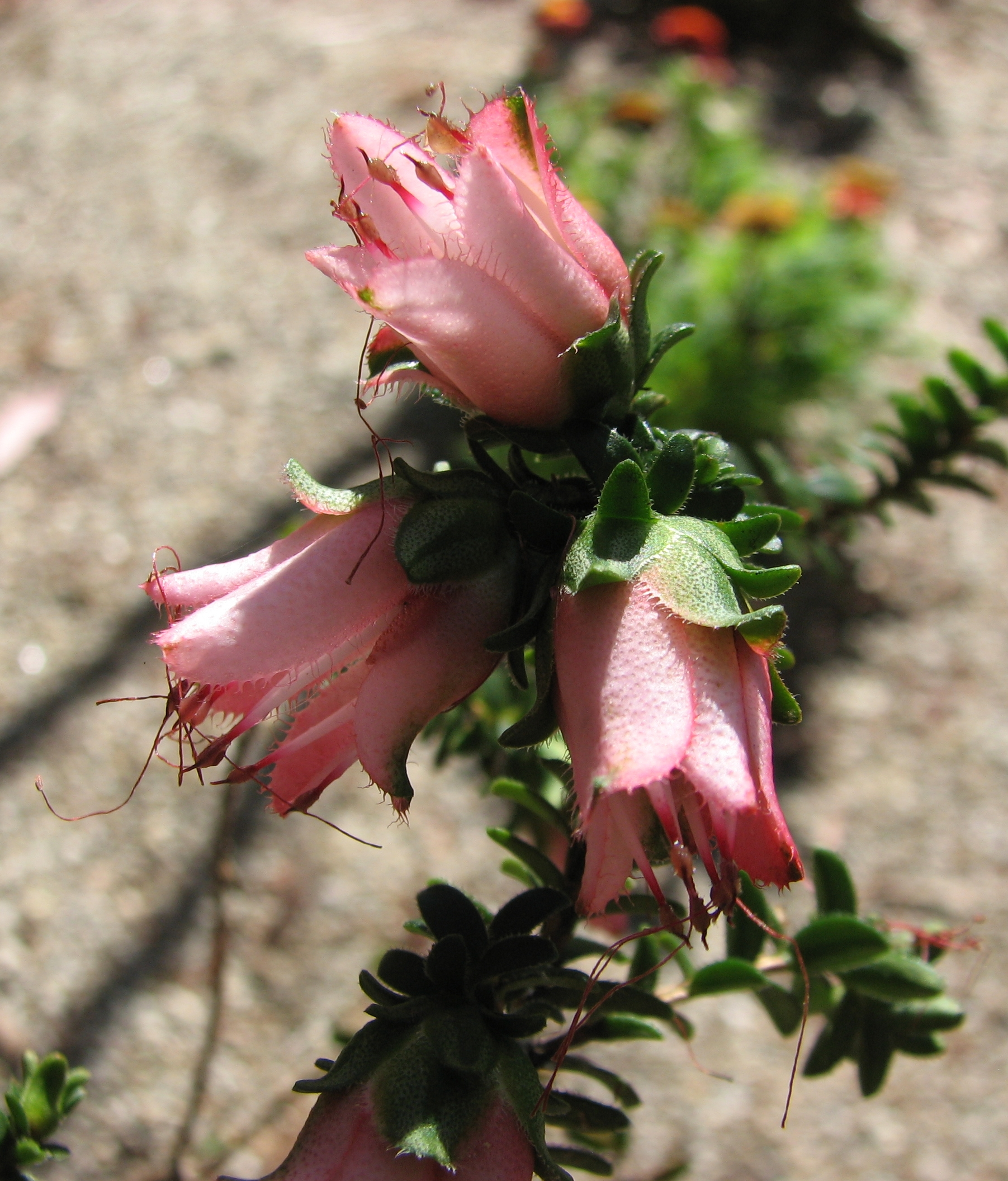

Conservation status
- Vulnerable (EPBC Act)

Scientific classification
- Kingdom: Plantae
- Clade: Tracheophytes
- Clade: Angiosperms
- Clade: Eudicots
- Clade: Rosids
- Order: Myrtales
- Family: Myrtaceae
- Genus: Darwinia
- Species: D. squarrosa

Binomial name
- Darwinia squarrosa (Turcz.) Domin.

= Darwinia squarrosa =

Fringed mountain bell

Species of flowering plant

Darwinia squarrosa, commonly known as the fringed mountain bell or pink mountain bell, is a shrub that is endemic to the south-west of Western Australia.

== Description ==
Darwinia squarrosa is a shrub with an erect and straggly habit, typically growing a height of 0.2–1 m (7.9 in – 3 ft 3.4 in). The fringed bracts around the flowers form a pendent "bell" which is usually red or pink. These are primarily produced between August and November in the species' native range.

== Taxonomy and naming ==
Darwinia squarrosa was first formally described in 1852 by Ukrainian-Russian botanist Nicolai Stepanovitch Turczaninow who gave it the name Genetyllis squarrosa. The species was transferred to the genus Darwinia in 1923 by Czech botanist Karel Domin. The specific epithet (squarrosa) is a Latin word meaning "rough with stiff scales, bracts or processes".

== Distribution and habitat ==
The fringed mountain bell occurs on rocky slopes of the eastern peaks of the Stirling Range National Park.

== Conservation status ==
The fringed mountain bell is classified as "vulnerable" under the Australian Government Environment Protection and Biodiversity Conservation Act 1999 and as "Threatened Flora (Declared Rare Flora — Extant)" by the Department of Environment and Conservation (Western Australia).

== Use in horticulture ==
The species requires good drainage and protection from direct sun. It is difficult to propagate from seed, but cuttings strike readily. Grafting on stocks of Darwinia citriodora may be carried out in areas with unsuitable growing conditions.
