= Ericomyrtus drummondii =

Scientific classification
- Kingdom: Plantae
- Clade: Tracheophytes
- Clade: Angiosperms
- Clade: Eudicots
- Clade: Rosids
- Order: Myrtales
- Family: Myrtaceae
- Genus: Ericomyrtus
- Species: E. drummondii

Binomial name
- Ericomyrtus drummondii Turcz.

Species of flowering plant

Ericomyrtus drummondii is a shrub endemic to Western Australia.

It is found in the Great Southern, Wheatbelt and Goldfields-Esperance regions of Western Australia between Wongan Hills, Esperance and Albany.
