= Austrobaeckea pygmaea =

Scientific classification
- Kingdom: Plantae
- Clade: Tracheophytes
- Clade: Angiosperms
- Clade: Eudicots
- Clade: Rosids
- Order: Myrtales
- Family: Myrtaceae
- Genus: Austrobaeckea
- Species: A. pygmaea

Binomial name
- Austrobaeckea pygmaea (R.Br. ex Benth.) Rye

Synonyms
- Baeckea pygmaea R.Br. ex Benth.

Species of flowering plant

Austrobaeckea pygmaea is a species of flowering plant in the family Myrtaceae and is endemic to the south-west of Western Australia. It is a slender and erect or spreading shrub with narrowly egg-shaped to almost linear leaves and small white flowers with 12 to 25 stamens.

== Description ==
Austrobaeckea pygmaea is a shrub, typically 10–50 cm (3.9–19.7 in) high and 60–100 cm (24–39 in) wide. Its leaves are narrowly egg-shaped with the narrower end towards the base, 3.5–8 mm (0.14–0.31 in) long, 0.5–1.1 mm (0.020–0.043 in) wide and 0.4–0.7 mm (0.016–0.028 in) thick on a petiole 0.2–0.4 mm (0.0079–0.0157 in) long. The flowers are 3–5 mm (0.12–0.20 in) in diameter and are borne in groups of up to three on peduncles 4–11 mm (0.16–0.43 in) long. The sepals are broadly triangular, 0.4–0.8 mm (0.016–0.031 in) long and the petals are white, 1.2–1.8 mm (0.047–0.071 in) long. There are 12 to 25 stamens, the ovary usually has two locules and the style is 0.7–0.8 mm (0.028–0.031 in) long. Flowering occurs from December to March and the fruit is a capsule 1.3–1.5 mm (0.051–0.059 in) long.

== Taxonomy ==
This species was first formally described in 1867 by George Bentham in Flora Australiensis who gave it the name Baeckea pygmaea from an unpublished manuscript by Robert Brown who collected the type specimens from King George Sound. In 2021, Barbara Lynette Rye transferred the species to Austrobaeckea as A. pygmaea in the journal Nuytsia. The specific epithet (pygmaea) means "dwarf".

== Distribution and habitat ==
Austrobaeckea pygmaea is found on flats and winter-wet swamps, from near Lake Muir to near Albany in the Jarrah Forest and Warren biogeographic regions of south-western Western Australia.

== Conservation status ==
Austrobaeckea pygmaea is listed as "not threatened" by the Government of Western Australia Department of Biodiversity, Conservation and Attractions.
