= Ericomyrtus parviflora =

Scientific classification
- Kingdom: Plantae
- Clade: Tracheophytes
- Clade: Angiosperms
- Clade: Eudicots
- Clade: Rosids
- Order: Myrtales
- Family: Myrtaceae
- Genus: Ericomyrtus
- Species: E. parviflora

Binomial name
- Ericomyrtus parviflora (Turcz.) Rye

Species of flowering plant

Ericomyrtus parviflora is a shrub endemic to Western Australia.

It is found in the South West, Great Southern, Wheatbelt and Goldfields-Esperance regions of Western Australia between York, Bridgetown and Jerramungup.
