= Austrobaeckea columnaris =

Scientific classification
- Kingdom: Plantae
- Clade: Tracheophytes
- Clade: Angiosperms
- Clade: Eudicots
- Clade: Rosids
- Order: Myrtales
- Family: Myrtaceae
- Genus: Austrobaeckea
- Species: A. columnaris

Binomial name
- Austrobaeckea columnaris Rye

Species of flowering plant

Austrobaeckea columnaris is a species of flowering plant in the family Myrtaceae which is endemic to southern Western Australia. It occurs south of Ongerup and has been recorded on flats, especially shallow, loamy sand with clay and spongolite.

== Description ==
The shrub grows to 0.4–0.8 meters tall, 0.1–0.6 m wide. It can be differentiated from other Austrobaeckea species as it has branches with a column-like appearance. Leaves tend to be clustered. Terminal galls may be found.

== Etymology ==
A. columnaris is named for its column-like branches.
