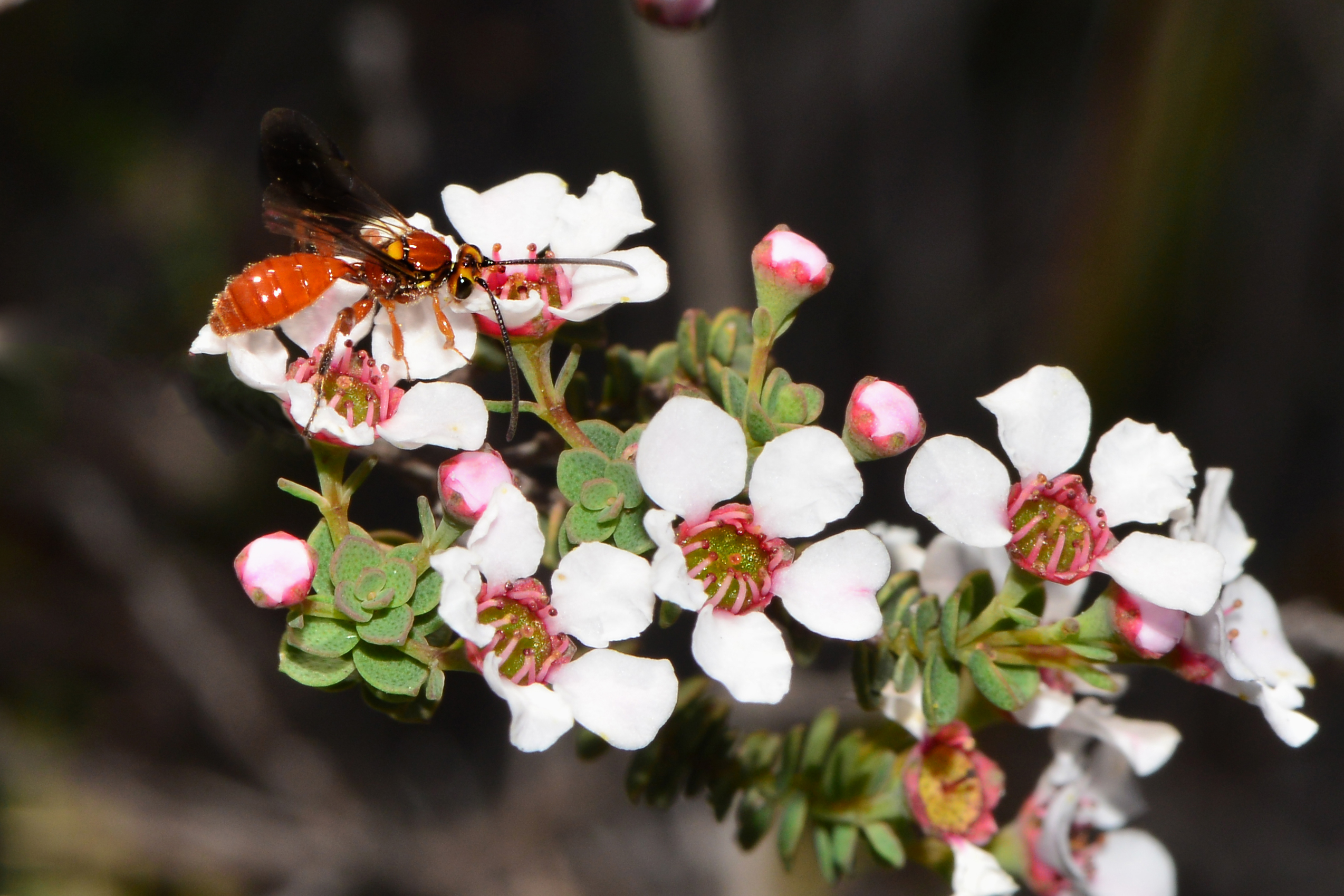

Scientific classification
- Kingdom: Plantae
- Clade: Tracheophytes
- Clade: Angiosperms
- Clade: Eudicots
- Clade: Rosids
- Order: Myrtales
- Family: Myrtaceae
- Genus: Ericomyrtus
- Species: E. serpyllifolia

Binomial name
- Ericomyrtus serpyllifolia (Turcz.) Rye

= Ericomyrtus serpyllifolia =

Species of flowering plant

Ericomyrtus serpyllifolia is a shrub endemic to Western Australia.

It is found in the Mid West, South West, Great Southern, Wheatbelt and Goldfields-Esperance regions of Western Australia between Geraldton, Albany and Cape Arid National Park.
