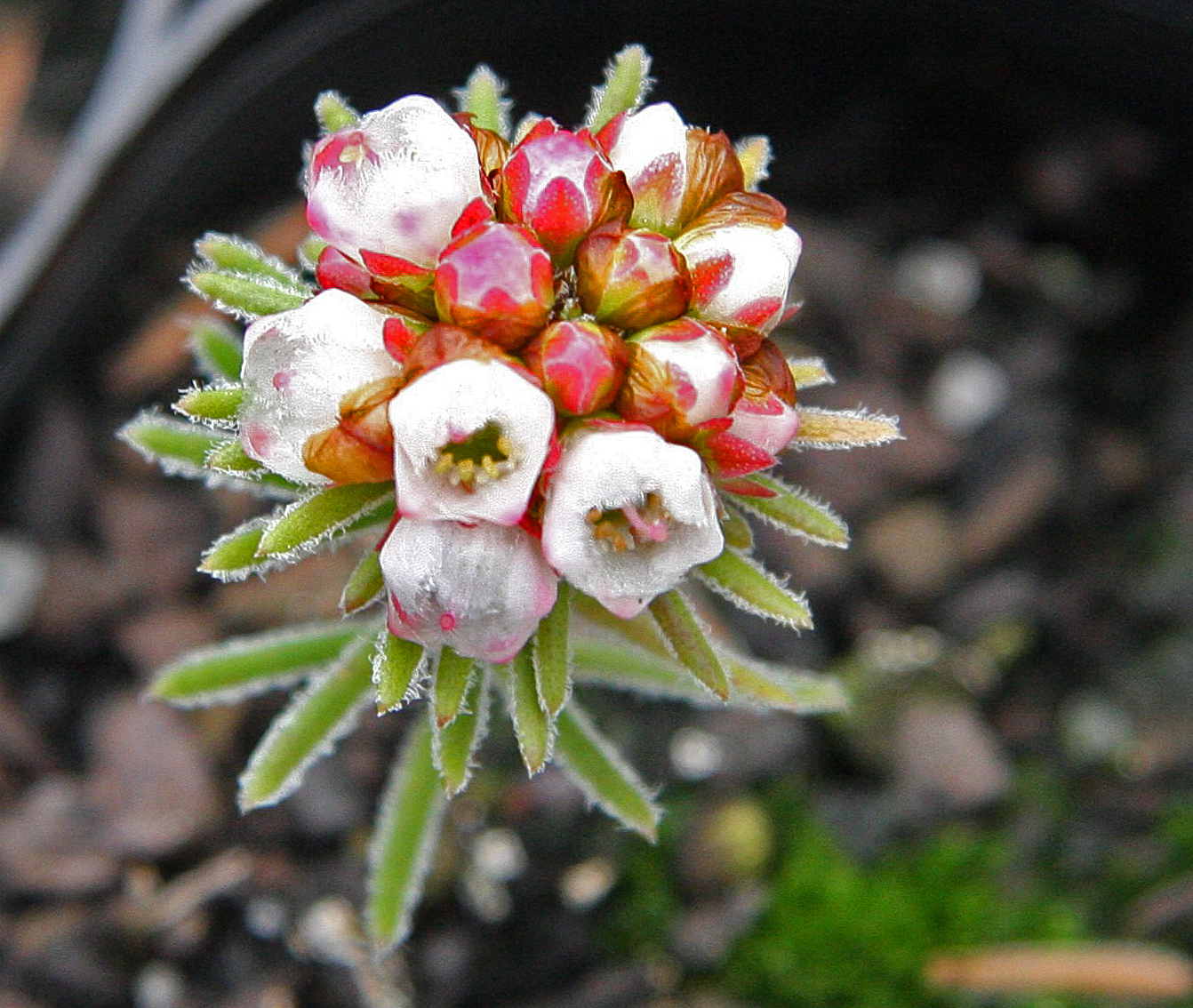

Scientific classification
- Kingdom: Plantae
- Clade: Tracheophytes
- Clade: Angiosperms
- Clade: Eudicots
- Clade: Rosids
- Order: Myrtales
- Family: Myrtaceae
- Genus: Chamelaucium
- Species: C. drummondii

Binomial name
- Chamelaucium drummondii Meisn.

= Chamelaucium drummondii =

Species of flowering plant

Chamaelaucium drummondii is a member of the family Myrtaceae endemic to Western Australia.

The erect shrub typically grows to a height of 0.15 to 1 metre (0 to 3 ft) but can reach as high as 2 metres (7 ft). It blooms between August and January producing white-pink flowers.

Found along saline waterways and lakes and on sand plains in the Wheatbelt and Mid West regions of Western Australia where it grows in sand or clay soils over laterite or granite.
