= Chamelaucium confertiflorum =

Scientific classification
- Kingdom: Plantae
- Clade: Tracheophytes
- Clade: Angiosperms
- Clade: Eudicots
- Clade: Rosids
- Order: Myrtales
- Family: Myrtaceae
- Genus: Chamelaucium
- Species: C. confertiflorum

Binomial name
- Chamelaucium confertiflorum Domin

Species of flowering plant

Chamaelaucium confertiflorum is a member of the family Myrtaceae endemic to Western Australia.

The slender and erect shrub typically grows to a height of 0.3 to 1.0 metre (1 to 3 ft). It blooms between October and December producing white flowers.

Found in the Great Southern region of Western Australia where it grows in sandy or peaty soils.
