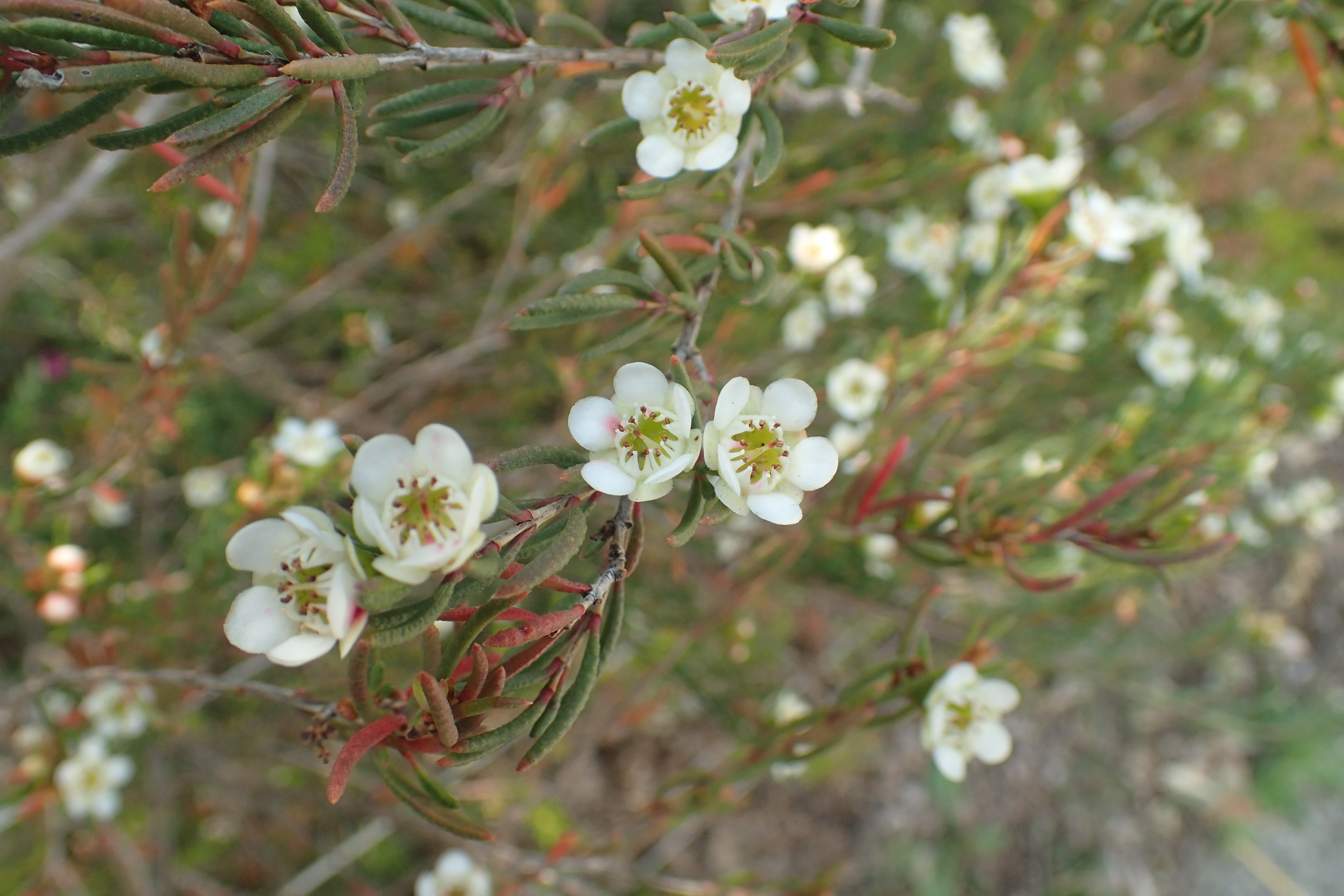

Scientific classification
- Kingdom: Plantae
- Clade: Tracheophytes
- Clade: Angiosperms
- Clade: Eudicots
- Clade: Rosids
- Order: Myrtales
- Family: Myrtaceae
- Genus: Chamelaucium
- Species: C. axillare

Binomial name
- Chamelaucium axillare Benth.

Synonyms
- Chamaelaucium axillare Benth. orth. var.; Chamelaucium sp. Hamersley (N.McQuoid 379) WA Herbarium; Darwinia axillaris (Benth.) F.Muell.

= Chamelaucium axillare =

Esperance wax

Species of flowering plant

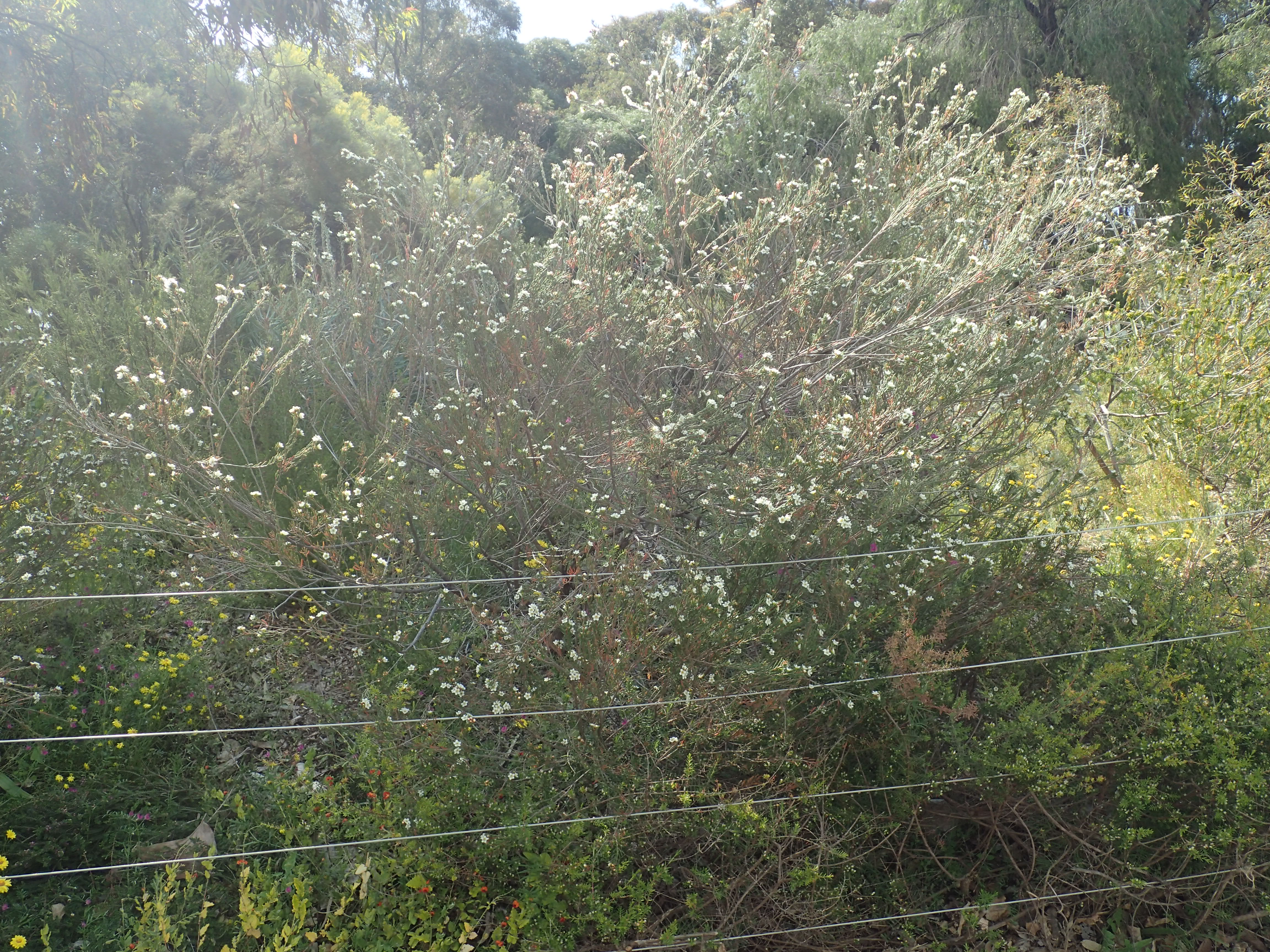
Habit in Kings Park, Perth

Chamelaucium axillare, commonly known as Esperance waxflower, is a species of flowering plant in the family Myrtaceae endemic to Western Australia.

The erect shrub typically grows to a height of 0.2 to 2 metres (1 to 7 ft). It blooms between September and December producing white-pink-red flowers.

Often grown as an ornamental shrub it has scented evergreen foliage produces red buds and small white flowers. It can be grown as a light screen and used for cut flowers.

Found along the south coast with a scattered distribution in the Goldfields-Esperance region of Western Australia where it grows in sandy soils.

The species was originally described by the botanist George Bentham in 1867 Flora Australiensis. In 1882, Ferdinand von Mueller changed the name to Darwinia axillaris in his Systematic Census of Australian Plants, but the name has not been accepted by other authorities.
