= Chamelaucium brevifolium =

Scientific classification
- Kingdom: Plantae
- Clade: Tracheophytes
- Clade: Angiosperms
- Clade: Eudicots
- Clade: Rosids
- Order: Myrtales
- Family: Myrtaceae
- Genus: Chamelaucium
- Species: C. brevifolium

Binomial name
- Chamelaucium brevifolium Benth.

Species of flowering plant

Chamaelaucium brevifolium is a member of the family Myrtaceae endemic to Western Australia.

The erect and open shrub typically grows to a height of 0.3 to 1.3 metres (1 to 4 ft). It blooms between September and November producing white flowers.

Found on undulating plains in the northern Wheatbelt region of Western Australia where it grows in sandy soils over laterite.
