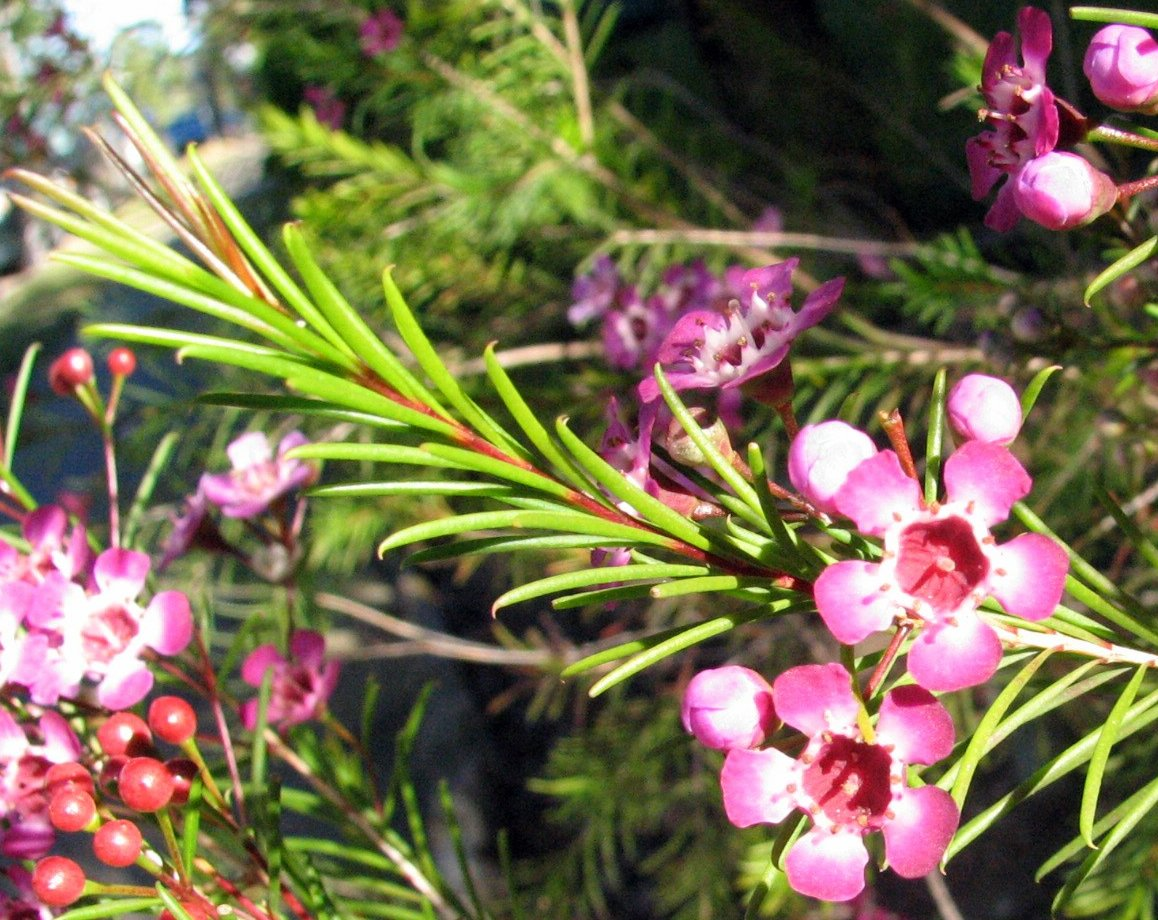
- Chamelaucium uncinatum

Scientific classification
- Kingdom: Plantae
- Clade: Tracheophytes
- Clade: Angiosperms
- Clade: Eudicots
- Clade: Rosids
- Order: Myrtales
- Family: Myrtaceae
- Subfamily: Myrtoideae
- Tribe: Chamelaucieae
- Genus: Chamelaucium; Desf.

Type species
- Chamelaucium ciliatum Desf.

Diversity
- About 30 species.

Synonyms
- Decalophium Turcz.

= Chamelaucium =

Genus of flowering plants

Chamelaucium, also known as waxflower, is a genus of shrubs endemic to south western Western Australia. They belong to the myrtle family Myrtaceae and have flowers similar to those of the tea-trees (Leptospermum). The best-known species is the Geraldton wax, Chamelaucium uncinatum, which is cultivated widely for its large attractive flowers.

== Description ==
Plants of the genus Chamelaucium are woody evergreen shrubs ranging from 15 cm (6 in) to 3 m (10 ft) high. The leaves are tiny to medium-sized and arranged oppositely on the stems. They contain oil glands and are aromatic, often giving off a pleasant aroma when crushed. The flowers are small and have five petals, ten stamens, and are followed by small hardened fruit.

== Taxonomy ==
The genus was first defined by French botanist René Louiche Desfontaines in 1819. The derivation of the name is unclear. They are commonly known as waxplants, or wax flowers from the waxy feel of the petals. Fourteen species are currently recognised within the genus. It gives its name to a number of closely related genera, collectively known as the Chamelaucium alliance within the family Myrtaceae; larger members include Verticordia, Calytrix, Darwinia, Micromyrtus, Thryptomene and Baeckea.

=== Species ===
The following species are recognized in the genus Chamelaucium:

- Chamelaucium axillare F.Muell. ex Benth. – Esperance waxflower
- Chamelaucium brevifolium Benth.
- Chamelaucium ciliatum Desf.
- Chamelaucium confertiflorum Domin
- Chamelaucium drummondii (Turcz.) Meisn.
- Chamelaucium erythrochlorum N.G.Marchant
- Chamelaucium floriferum N.G.Marchant
- Chamelaucium forrestii (F.Muell.) N.G.Marchant
- Chamelaucium gracile F.Muell.
- Chamelaucium heterandrum Benth.
- Chamelaucium lullfitzii N.G.Marchant
- Chamelaucium marchantii Strid
- Chamelaucium megalopetalum F.Muell. ex Benth – large waxflower
- Chamelaucium micranthum (Turcz.) Domin
- Chamelaucium orarium N.G.Marchant
- Chamelaucium pauciflorum (Turcz.) Benth.
- Chamelaucium repens (A.S.George) N.G.Marchant
- Chamelaucium roycei N.G.Marchant
- Chamelaucium uncinatum Schauer – Geraldton waxflower, Geraldton wax
- Chamelaucium virgatum Endl.
- Chamelaucium xanthocladum N.G.Marchant

== Distribution and habitat ==
Restricted to the southwest of Western Australia, Chamelaucium species grow most commonly in heathland communities growing on sand near the coast or inland, and in granite outcrops. Some grow in more semi arid climates.

== Cultivation ==
In cultivation, they do well in dryer climates with good drainage and sunny aspect. They are hardy to frost and drought, although sensitive to Phytophthora cinnamomi. The best known and most widely cultivated member of the genus by far is C. uncinatum, which is widely grown in gardens across Southern Australia, and for the cut flower industry in the USA and Israel.

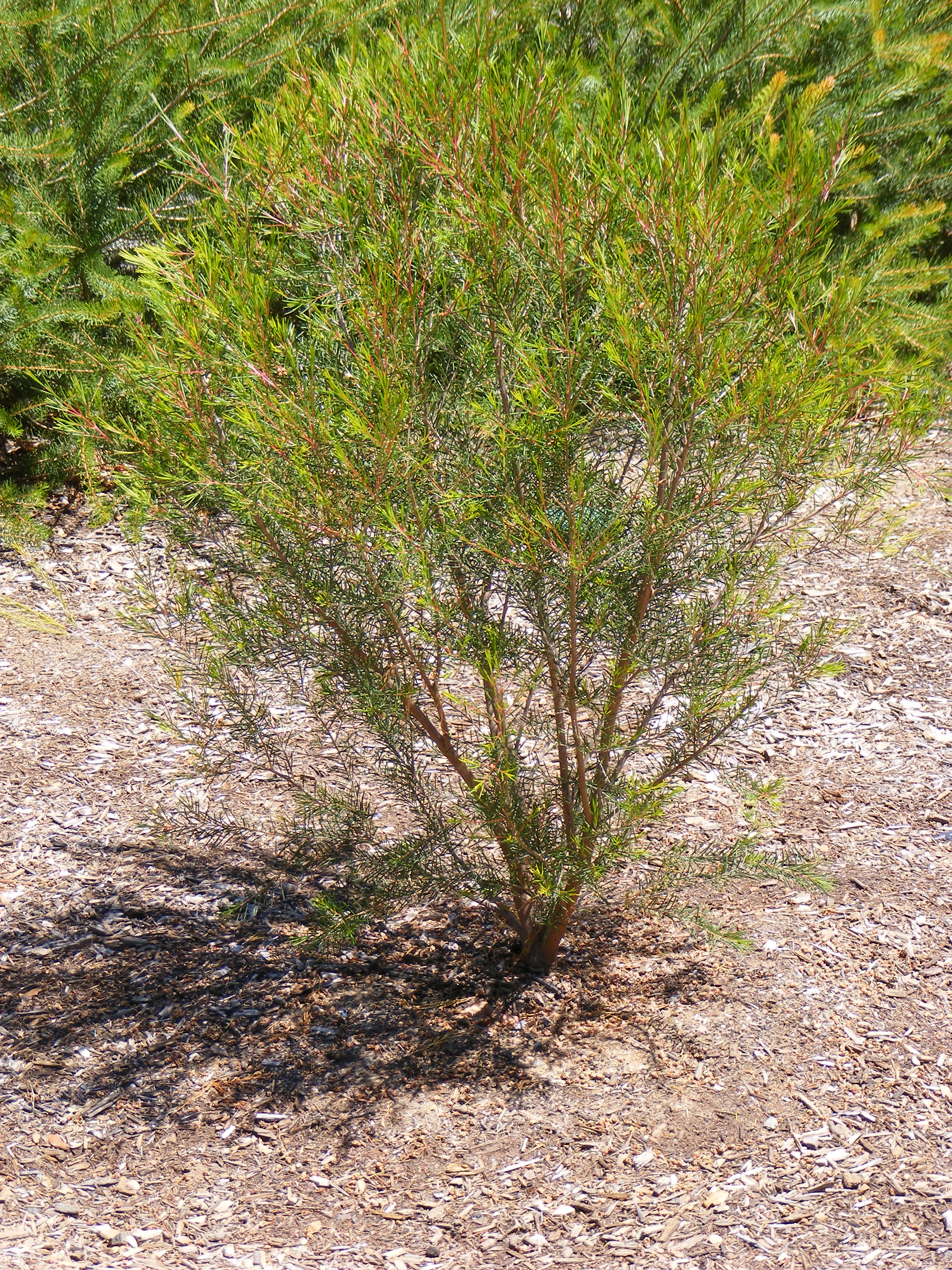
Chamelaucium uncinatum

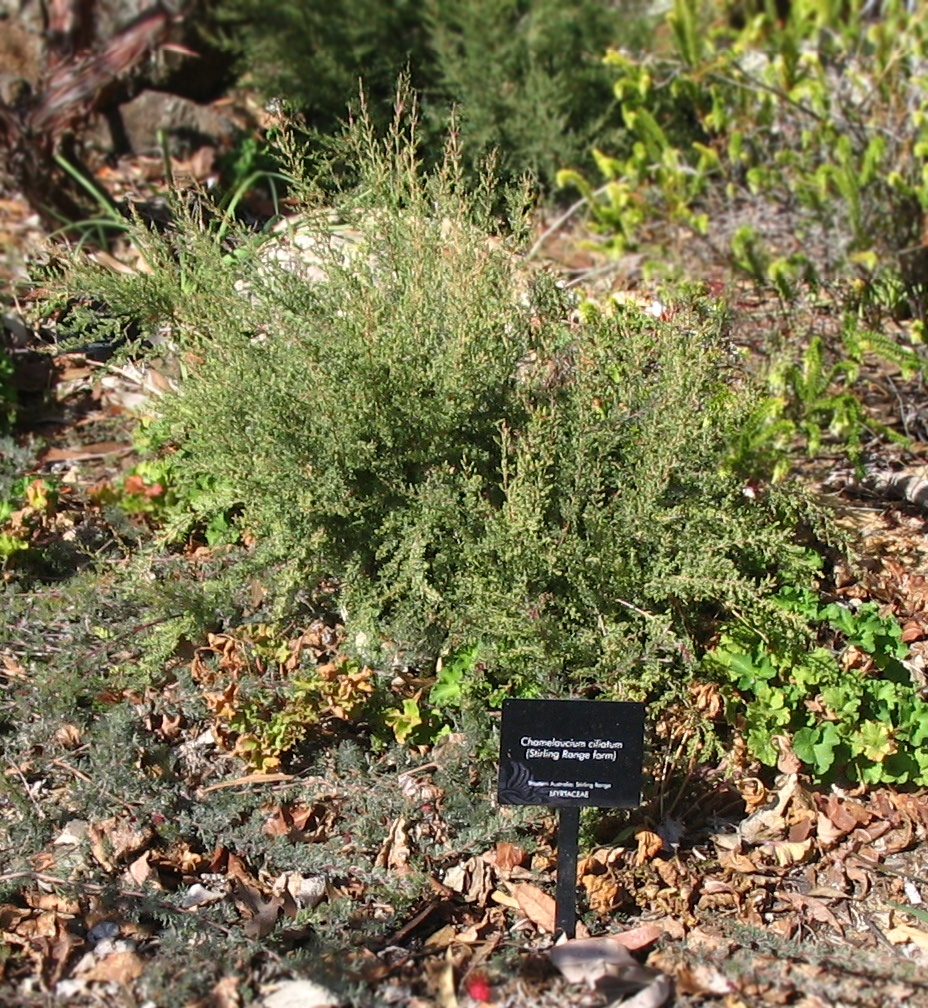
Chamelaucium ciliatum
