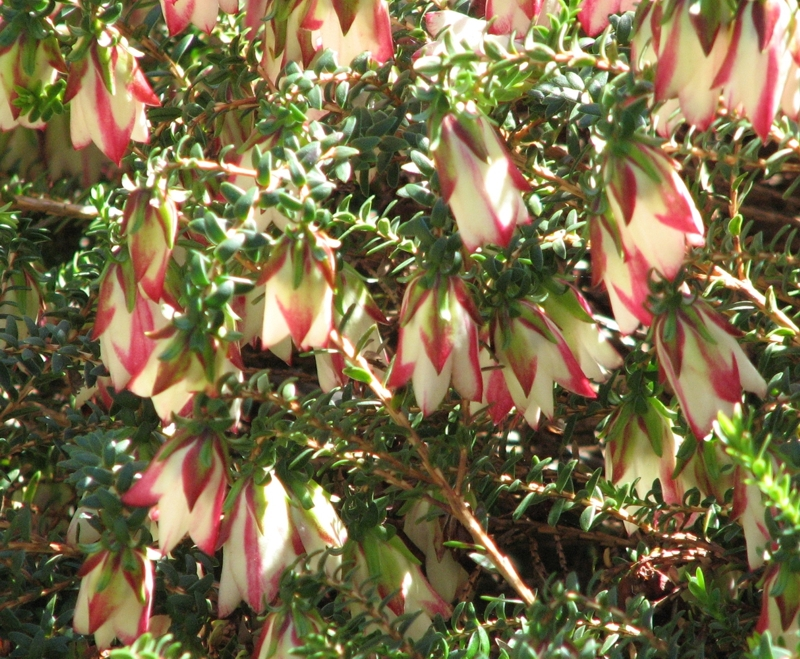
- Darwinia macrostegia in Wilson Botanic Park

Conservation status
- Priority Four — Rare Taxa (DEC)

Scientific classification
- Kingdom: Plantae
- Clade: Tracheophytes
- Clade: Angiosperms
- Clade: Eudicots
- Clade: Rosids
- Order: Myrtales
- Family: Myrtaceae
- Genus: Darwinia
- Species: D. macrostegia

Binomial name
- Darwinia macrostegia (Turcz.) Benth.
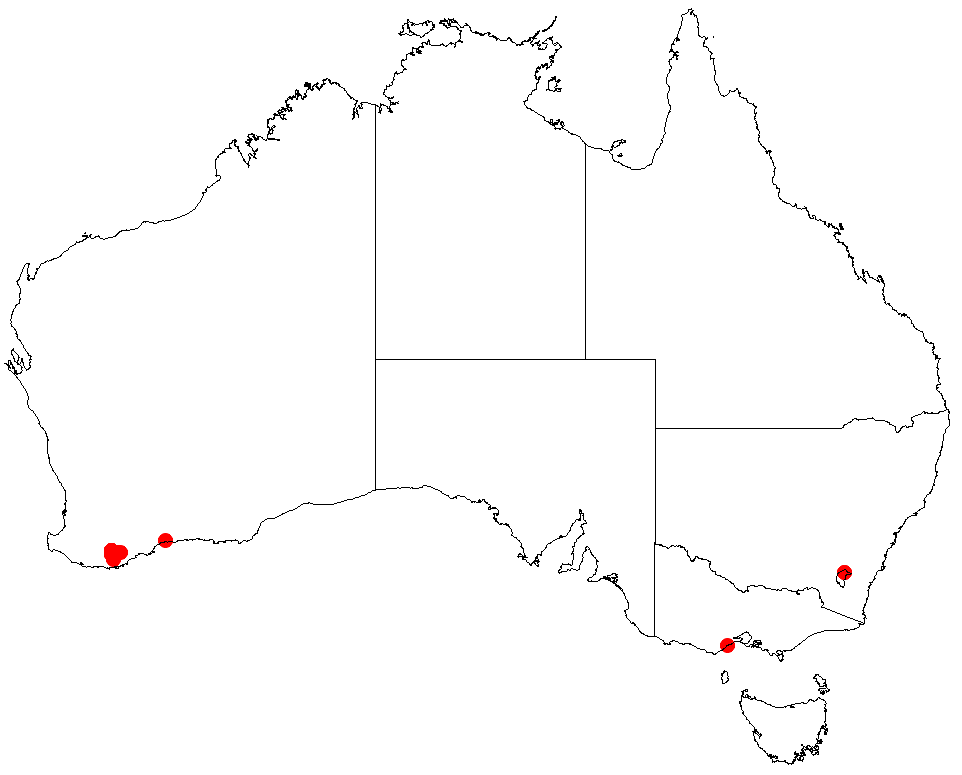
- Occurrence data from AVH

Synonyms
- Genetyllis macrostegia Turcz.; Genetyllis tulipifera (Lindl.) Planch.; Genetyllis tulipifera (Lindl.) Hook. isonym; Hedaroma tulipiferum Lindl.

= Darwinia macrostegia =

Mondurup bell

Species of flowering plant

Darwinia macrostegia, commonly known as Mondurup bell, is a species of flowering plant in the family Myrtaceae and is endemic to the south-west of Western Australia. It is a straggly shrub with elliptic leaves and clusters of pendent flowers surrounded by red and white bracts.

== Description ==
Darwinia macrostegia is a straggly shrub that typically grows to a height of 30–90 cm (12–35 in). It has scattered elliptic leaves with a pointed tip and the edges turned down, 1.3–1.8 mm (0.051–0.071 in) long. The flowers are arranged in bell-shaped clusters surrounded by red and white bracts nearly 3.8 mm (0.15 in) long. Flowering mainly occurs from August to November.

== Taxonomy and naming ==
The species was first formally described in 1849 by Nikolai Turczaninow who gave it the name Genetyllis macrostegia and published the description in Bulletin de la Société Impériale des Naturalistes de Moscou. In 1865, George Bentham changed the name to Darwinia macrostegia in The Journal of the Linnean Society, Botany. The specific epithet (macrostegia) means "large roof" or "tent", referring to the floral bracts.

A 1951 newspaper article about "Mondurup", a "long mountain that dominates the western end of the range", described this plant as "The Climber's Badge".

== Distribution and habitat ==
Mondurup bell occurs in and near the Stirling Range National Park in five separate populations, and grows in stony soils on rocky hillsides and in gullies in the Esperance Plains and Jarrah Forest bioregions of south-western Western Australia.

== Conservation status ==
Darwinia macrostegia is listed as "Priority Four" by the Government of Western Australia Department of Biodiversity, Conservation and Attractions, meaning that it is rare or near threatened.
