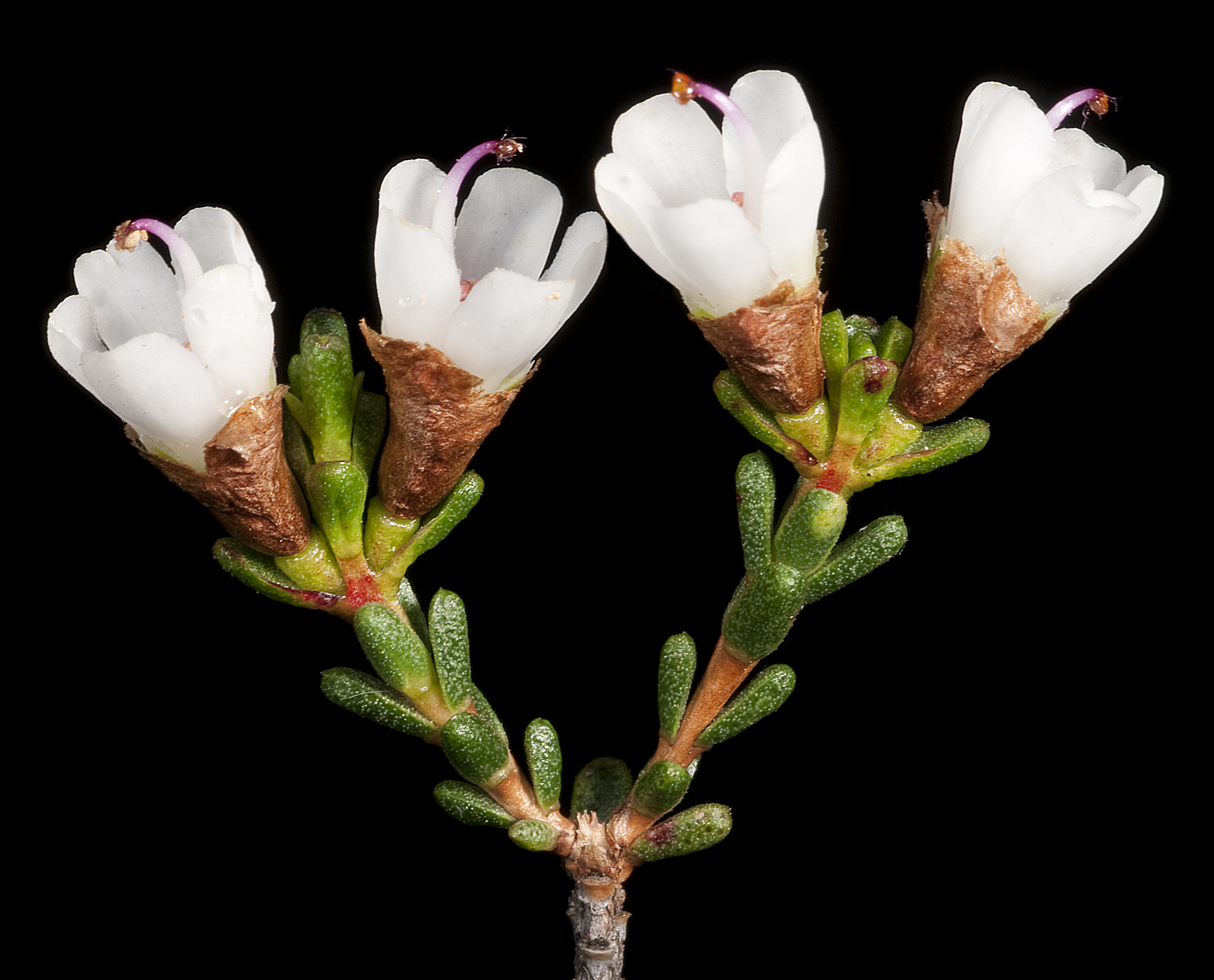
- Chamelaucium pauciflorum subsp. pauciflorum
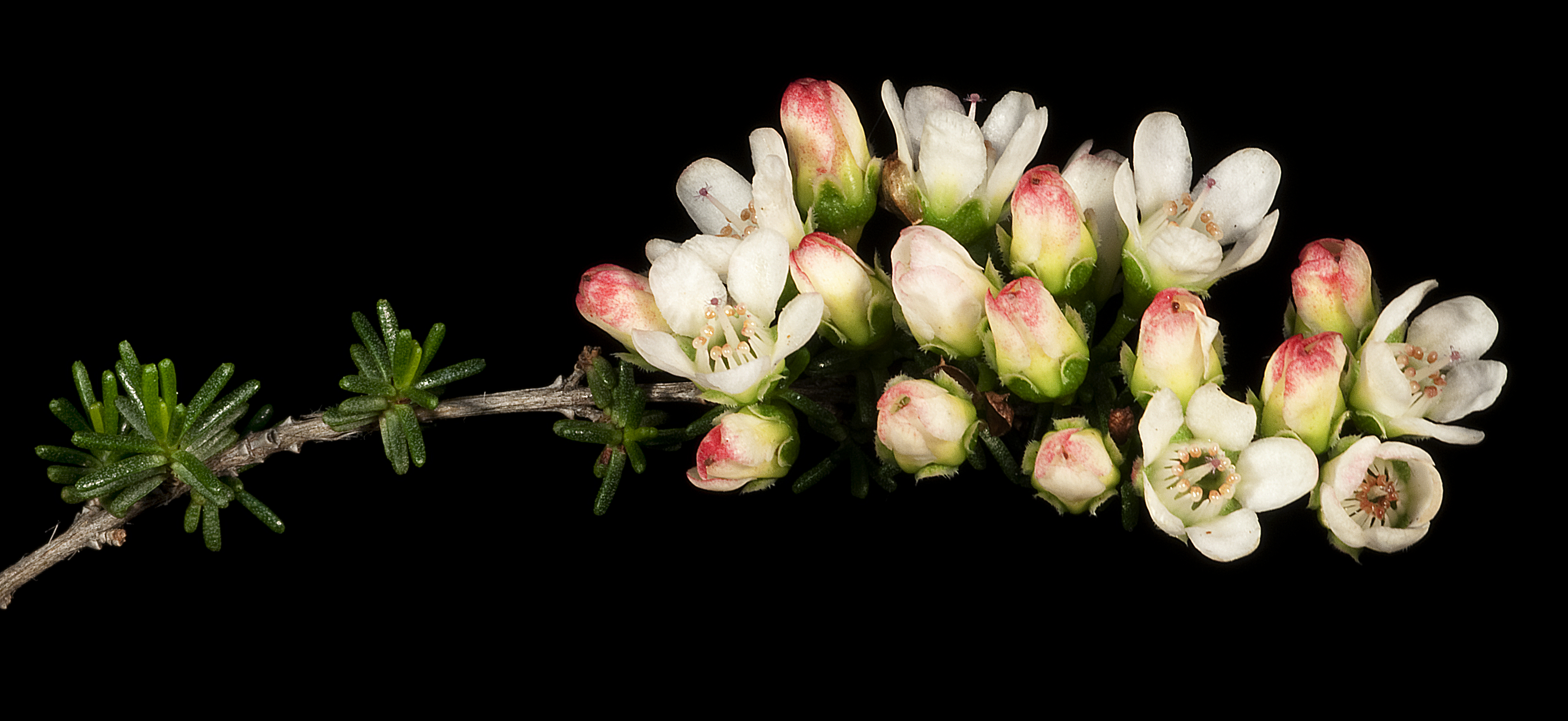
- Chamelaucium pauciflorum subsp. Perenjori

Scientific classification
- Kingdom: Plantae
- Clade: Tracheophytes
- Clade: Angiosperms
- Clade: Eudicots
- Clade: Rosids
- Order: Myrtales
- Family: Myrtaceae
- Genus: Chamelaucium
- Species: C. pauciflorum

Binomial name
- Chamelaucium pauciflorum (Turcz.) Benth.

= Chamelaucium pauciflorum =

Species of flowering plant

Chamaelaucium pauciflorum is a member of the family Myrtaceae endemic to Western Australia.

The shrub typically grows to a height of 0.15 to 1.4 metres (0.5 to 4.6 ft). It blooms in between August and October producing white-pink flowers.

Found on plains, ridges and rises in an area extending from the Mid West to the Wheatbelt, Great Southern and western Goldfields-Esperance regions of Western Australia where it grows in sandy or gravelly soils over laterite.
