= Stenostegia =

Scientific classification
- Kingdom: Plantae
- Clade: Tracheophytes
- Clade: Angiosperms
- Clade: Eudicots
- Clade: Rosids
- Order: Myrtales
- Family: Myrtaceae
- Genus: Stenostegia; A.R.Bean
- Species: S. congesta

Binomial name
- Stenostegia congesta A.R.Bean

Genus of plants

Stenostegia is a monotypic genus of flowering plants belonging to the family Myrtaceae. The only species is Stenostegia congesta.

Its native range is Northern Australia.
