= Anticoryne =

Scientific classification
- Kingdom: Plantae
- Clade: Tracheophytes
- Clade: Angiosperms
- Clade: Eudicots
- Clade: Rosids
- Order: Myrtales
- Family: Myrtaceae
- Genus: Anticoryne; Turcz.

Genus of flowering plants

Anticoryne is a genus of flowering plants belonging to the family Myrtaceae.

Its native range is Southwestern Australia.

Species:

- Anticoryne diosmoides Turcz.
- Anticoryne melanosperma Rye
- Anticoryne ovalifolia (F.Muell.) Rye
