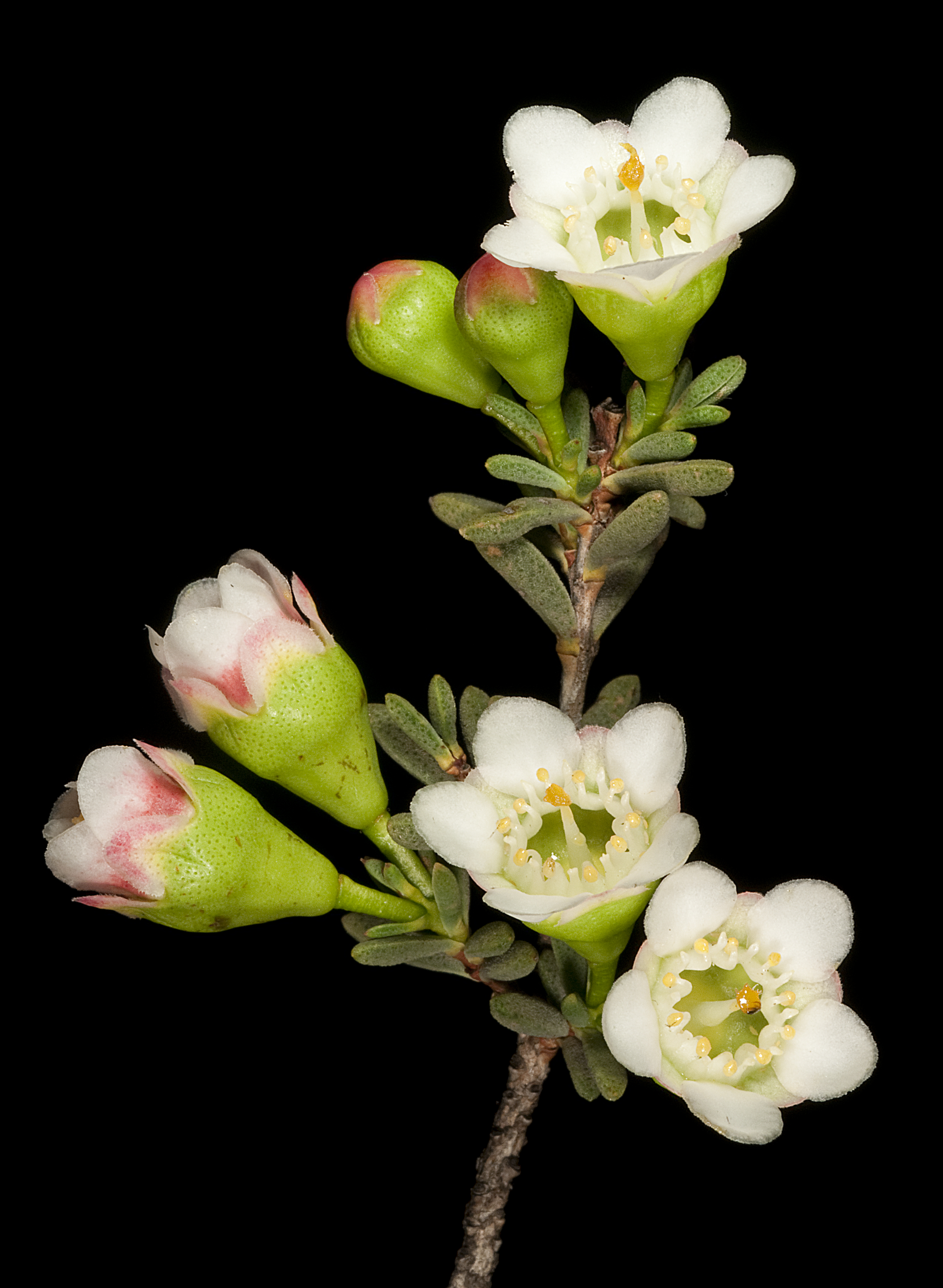

Scientific classification
- Kingdom: Plantae
- Clade: Tracheophytes
- Clade: Angiosperms
- Clade: Eudicots
- Clade: Rosids
- Order: Myrtales
- Family: Myrtaceae
- Genus: Chamelaucium
- Species: C. megalopetalum

Binomial name
- Chamelaucium megalopetalum Benth.

= Chamelaucium megalopetalum =

Large waxflower

Species of flowering plant

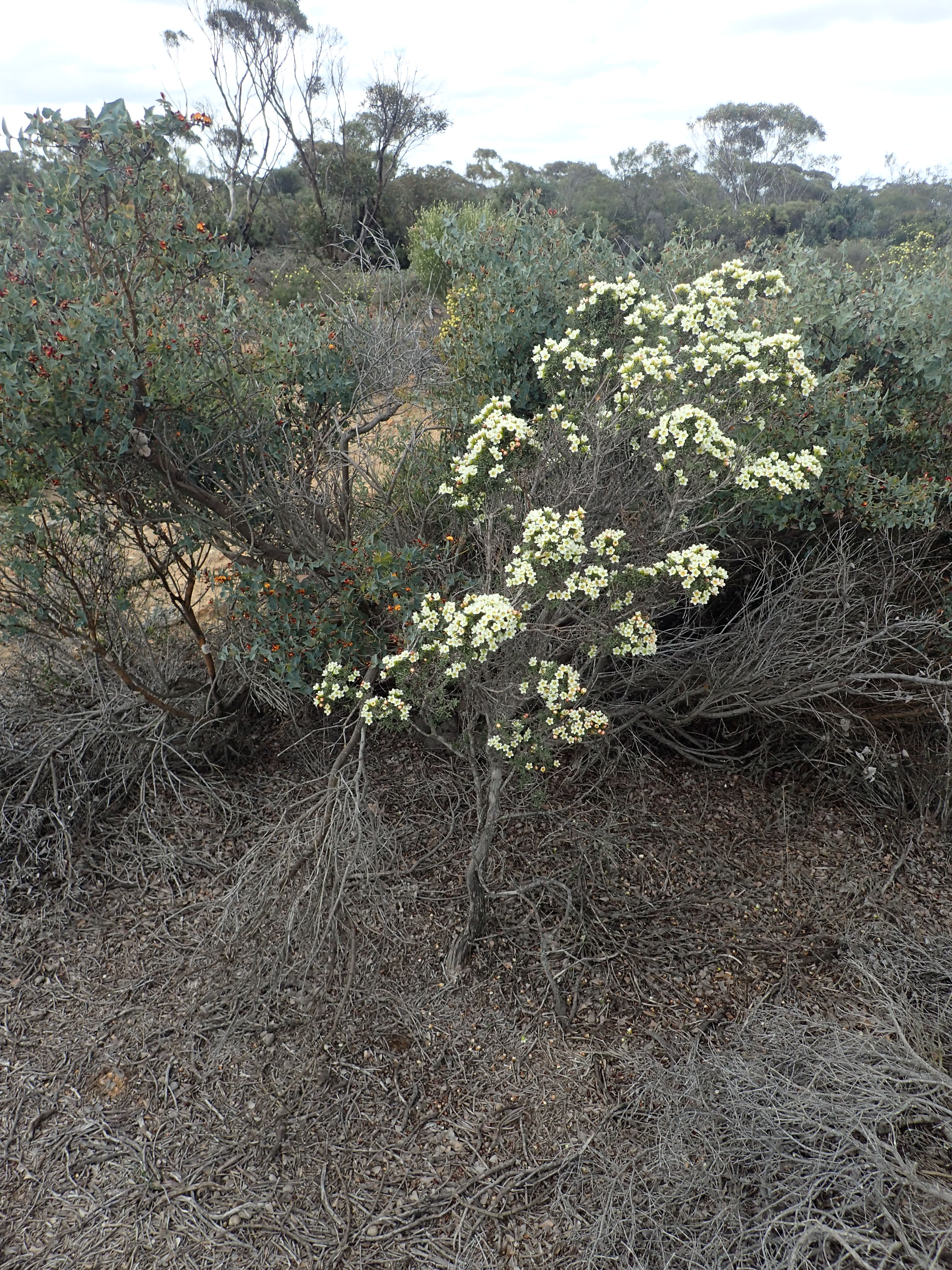
Habit near Tarin Rock, west of Lake Grace

Chamaelaucium megalopetalum, is a flowering plant commonly known as the large waxflower, is a member of the family Myrtaceae endemic to Western Australia.

The erect shrub typically grows to a height of 0.25 to 1.4 metres (1 to 5 ft) but can reach as high as 2 metres (7 ft). It blooms between May and December producing white-pink-red or cream-yellow flowers.

Found on sandy ridges or sand plains in the southern Wheatbelt, Great Southern and the south coast of the Goldfields-Esperance regions of Western Australia where it grows in sand or gravelly soils over laterite.
