= Chamelaucium virgatum =

Scientific classification
- Kingdom: Plantae
- Clade: Tracheophytes
- Clade: Angiosperms
- Clade: Eudicots
- Clade: Rosids
- Order: Myrtales
- Family: Myrtaceae
- Genus: Chamelaucium
- Species: C. virgatum

Binomial name
- Chamelaucium virgatum Endl.

Species of flowering plant

Chamaelaucium virgatum is a member of the family Myrtaceae endemic to Western Australia.

The erect shrub typically grows to a height of 0.3 to 1.7 metres (1.0 to 5.6 ft). It blooms in between August and January producing white-pink flowers.

Found on sand plains in an area extending from the southern Wheatbelt and into the south western Goldfields-Esperance regions of Western Australia where it grows in sandy or gravelly soils over laterite.
