= Chamelaucium gracile =

Scientific classification
- Kingdom: Plantae
- Clade: Tracheophytes
- Clade: Angiosperms
- Clade: Eudicots
- Clade: Rosids
- Order: Myrtales
- Family: Myrtaceae
- Genus: Chamelaucium
- Species: C. gracile

Binomial name
- Chamelaucium gracile F.Muell.

Species of flowering plant

Chamaelaucium gracile is a member of the family Myrtaceae endemic to Western Australia.

It is found in the Mid West region of Western Australia where it grows in sandy soils.
