= Astus =

Scientific classification
- Kingdom: Plantae
- Clade: Tracheophytes
- Clade: Angiosperms
- Clade: Eudicots
- Clade: Rosids
- Order: Myrtales
- Family: Myrtaceae
- Genus: Astus; Trudgen & Rye

Genus of flowering plants

Astus is a genus of flowering plants belonging to the family Myrtaceae.

Its native range is Southwest Australia.

Species:

- Astus duomilia Trudgen & Rye
- Astus subroseus Trudgen & Rye
- Astus tetragonus (F.Muell. ex Benth.) Trudgen & Rye
- Astus wittweri Trudgen & Rye
