= Chamelaucium marchantii =

Scientific classification
- Kingdom: Plantae
- Clade: Tracheophytes
- Clade: Angiosperms
- Clade: Eudicots
- Clade: Rosids
- Order: Myrtales
- Family: Myrtaceae
- Genus: Chamelaucium
- Species: C. marchantii

Binomial name
- Chamelaucium marchantii Strid

Species of flowering plant

Chamaelaucium marchantii is a member of the family Myrtaceae endemic to Western Australia.

The dense, rounded and many branched shrub typically grows to a height of 1 to 1.8 metres (3 to 6 ft). It blooms in October producing yellow-green flowers.

Found along creeks and on breakaway slopes in a small area in the Mid West region of Western Australia near Northampton where it grows in sandy soils.
