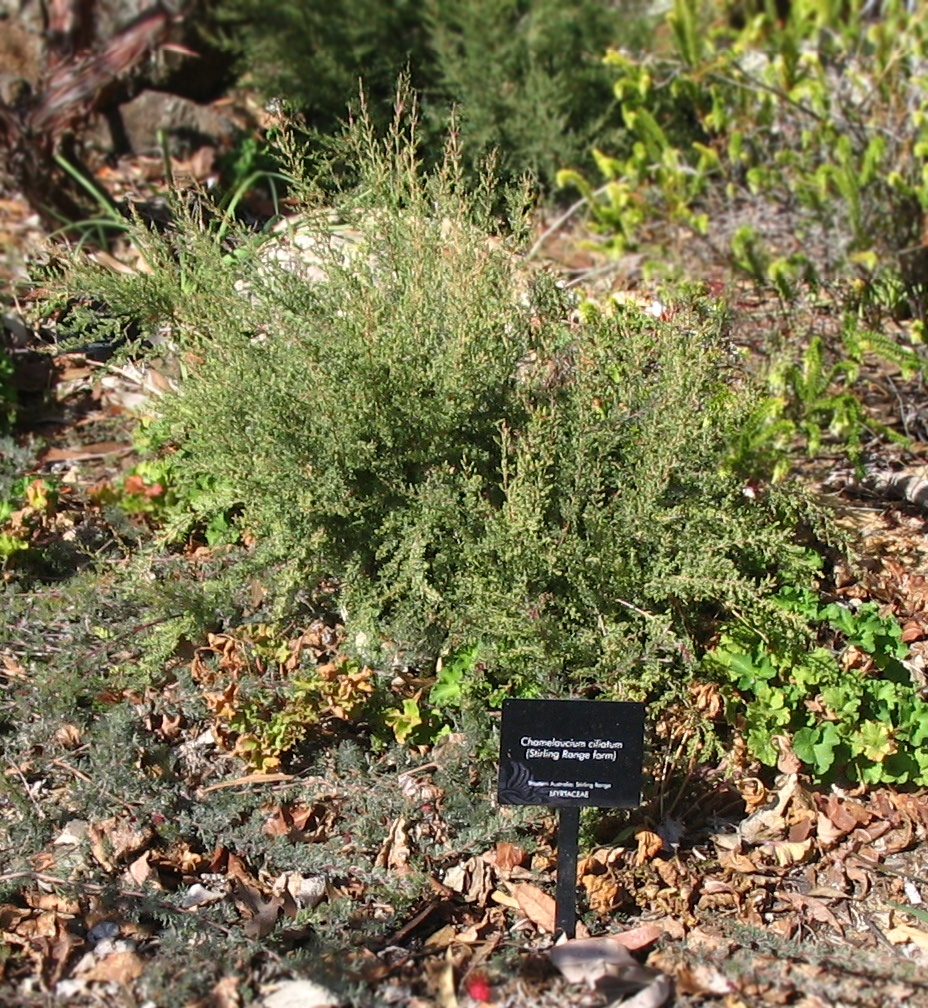
- Chamelaucium ciliatum

Scientific classification
- Kingdom: Plantae
- Clade: Tracheophytes
- Clade: Angiosperms
- Clade: Eudicots
- Clade: Rosids
- Order: Myrtales
- Family: Myrtaceae
- Genus: Chamelaucium
- Species: C. ciliatum

Binomial name
- Chamelaucium ciliatum Desf.

= Chamelaucium ciliatum =

Species of flowering plant

Chamaelaucium ciliatum is a member of the family Myrtaceae endemic to Western Australia.

The erect or spreading shrub typically grows to a height of 0.15 to 1.2 metres (0 to 4 ft). It blooms between January and December producing white flowers.

Found in the southern Wheatbelt, Great Southern and Goldfields-Esperance regions of Western Australia where it grows in many soil types.
