= Chamelaucium micranthum =

Scientific classification
- Kingdom: Plantae
- Clade: Tracheophytes
- Clade: Angiosperms
- Clade: Eudicots
- Clade: Rosids
- Order: Myrtales
- Family: Myrtaceae
- Genus: Chamelaucium
- Species: C. micranthum

Binomial name
- Chamelaucium micranthum (Turcz.) Domin

Species of flowering plant

Chamaelaucium micranthum is a member of the myrtle family, Myrtaceae, endemic to Western Australia.

The erect shrub typically grows to a height of 0.5 to 4 metres (2 to 13 ft). It blooms between August and November producing white flowers.

Found along creek beds and banks extending from the Mid West to the central Wheatbelt regions of Western Australia where it grows in sandy soils.
