= Tetrapora (plant) =

Scientific classification
- Kingdom: Plantae
- Clade: Tracheophytes
- Clade: Angiosperms
- Clade: Eudicots
- Clade: Rosids
- Order: Myrtales
- Family: Myrtaceae
- Genus: Tetrapora; Schauer

Genus of flowering plants

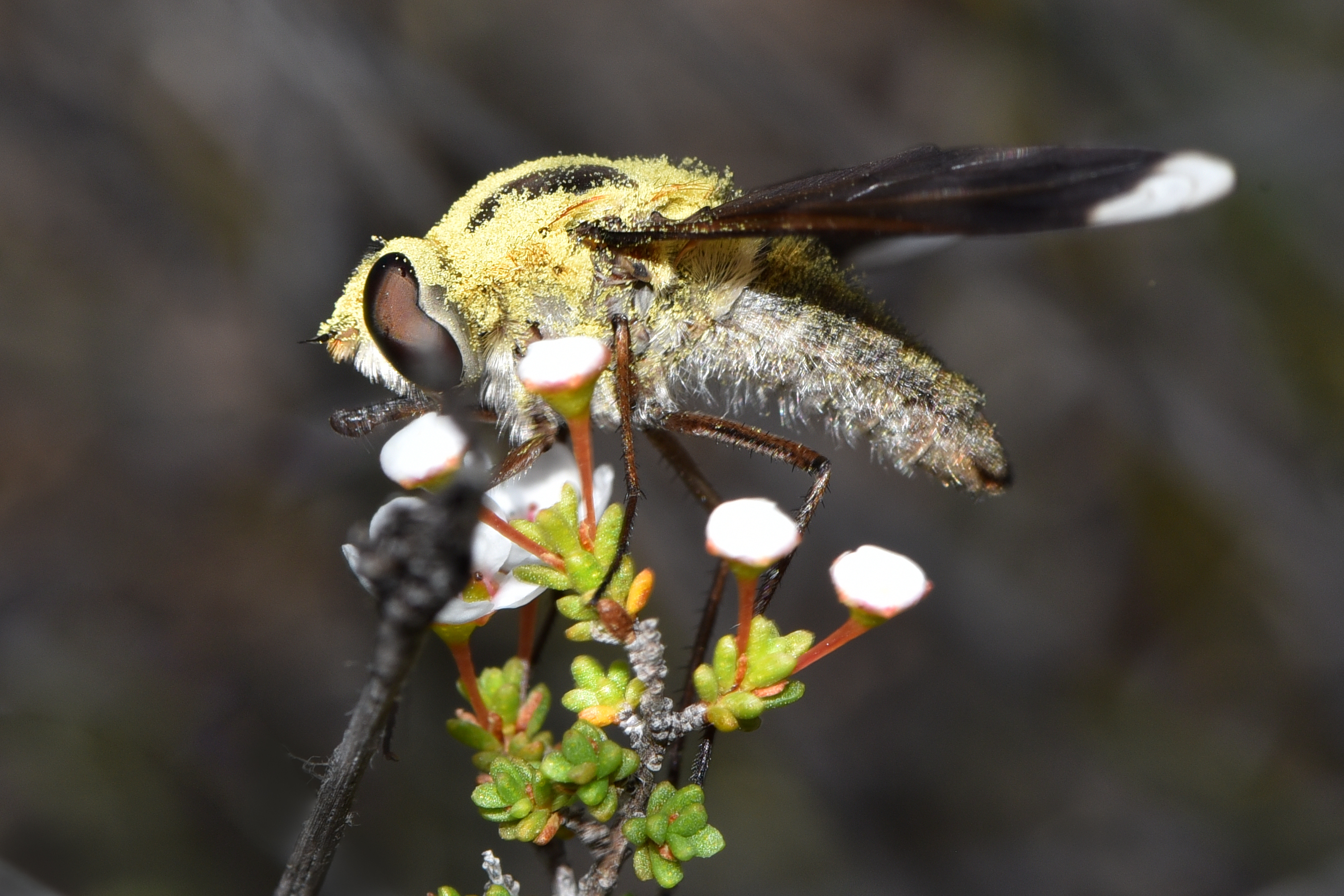
Comptosia decedens covered in pollen feeding on Tetrapora preissiana flowers.

Tetrapora is a genus of flowering plants belonging to the family Myrtaceae.

Its native range is Southwest Australia.

Species:

- Tetrapora floribunda (Benth.) Trudgen & Rye
- Tetrapora glomerata Turcz.
- Tetrapora preissiana Schauer
- Tetrapora tenuiramea (S.Moore) Trudgen & Rye
