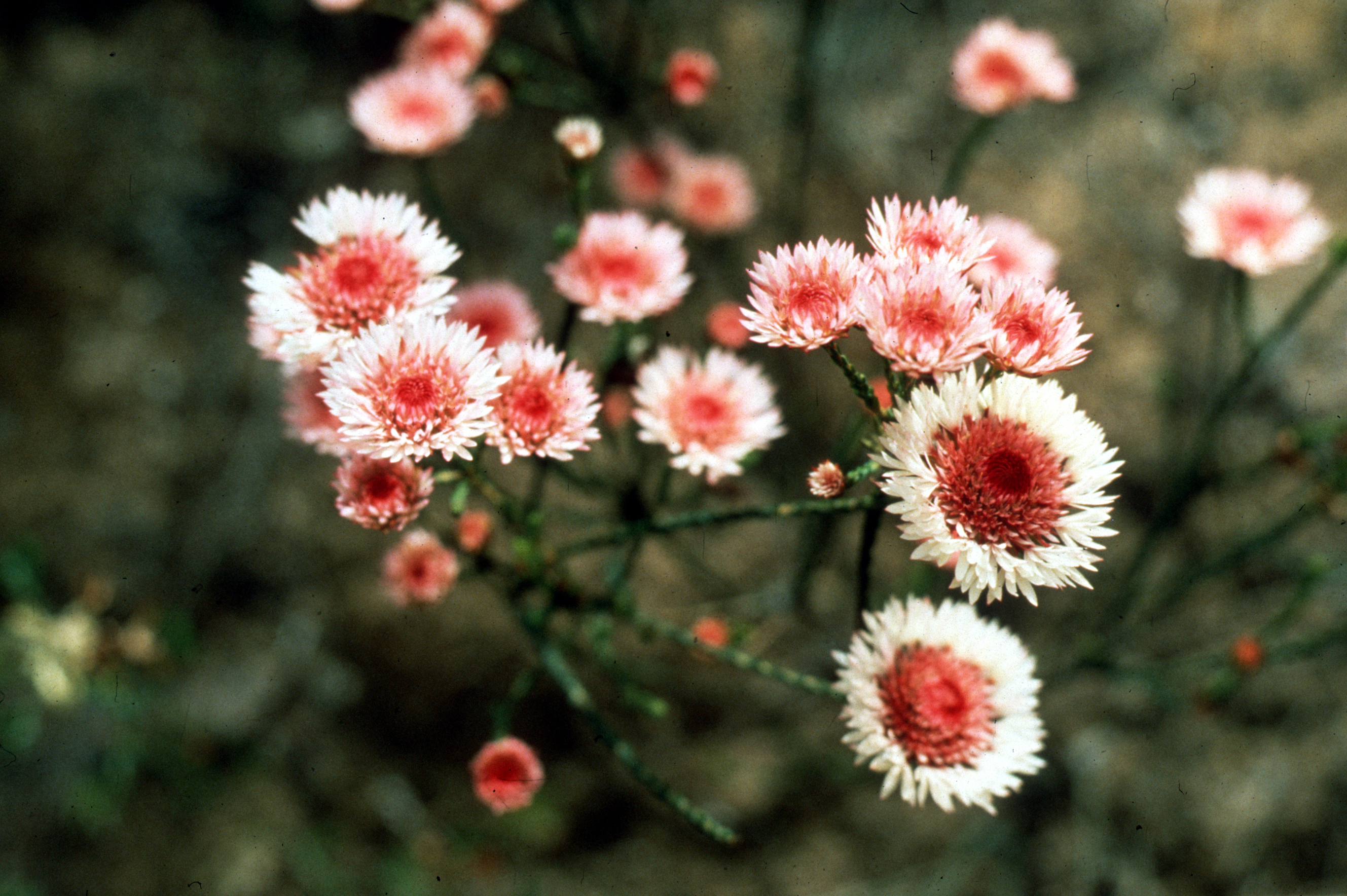
- Undescribed Albany daisy, Actinodium sp. 'Fitzgerald River'

Scientific classification
- Kingdom: Plantae
- Clade: Tracheophytes
- Clade: Angiosperms
- Clade: Eudicots
- Clade: Rosids
- Order: Myrtales
- Family: Myrtaceae
- Genus: Actinodium; Schauer
- Species: A. cunninghamii

Binomial name
- Actinodium cunninghamii Schauer

Synonyms
- Actinodium proliferum Turcz.; Triphelia brunioides R.Br. ex Endl. nom. illeg.

= Actinodium =

Swamp daisy

Genus of flowering plants

Actinodium cunninghamii, commonly known as swamp daisy or Albany daisy, is the only formally described species in the genus of flowering plants in the family Myrtaceae, Actinodium and is endemic to Western Australia.

== Description ==
Actinodium cunninghamii is a small, compact shrub that typically grows to a height of up to 30 cm (12 in) with leaves about 4 mm (0.16 in) long and 1–2 mm (0.039–0.079 in) wide. The flowers are borne in pinkish-brown, daisy-like heads 20–30 mm (0.79–1.18 in) in diameter. The heads are made up of tiny, bell-shaped flowers surrounded by sterile, strap-like ray flowers.

A related, but as yet undescribed species presently given the name Actinodium sp. 'Fitzgerald River' and also commonly known as Albany daisy, is a sparsely-branched shrub up to 1 m (3 ft 3 in) high with leaves 5–6 mm (0.20–0.24 in) long, the heads pink and white and 40–50 mm (1.6–2.0 in) wide. This species is more common than A. cunninghamii.

== Taxonomy ==
The genus Actinodium was first formally described in 1836 by Johannes Conrad Schauer in the journal Linnaea, Ein Journal für die Botanik in ihrem ganzen Umfange and Schauer later described Actinodium cunninghamii in John Lindley's A Natural System of Botany from specimens collected by Allan Cunningham. The genus name is derived from Greek and means "like the spokes of a wheel".

== Distribution and habitat ==
Actinodium cunninghamii grows in moist, sandy soil in forest and kwongan and is uncommon in nature. Both species of Actinodium usually grow in winter-wet depressions in near-coastal areas near Albany in the south-west of Western Australia.

== Use in horticulture ==
Actinodium sp. 'Fitzgerald River' (sometimes as A. cunninghamii) has been grown in gardens but is a short-lived plant requiring good drainage and a sheltered position. It can be propagated from cuttings.

== Cultural references ==
An image of A. cunninghamii was engraved for an Australian Stamp in 1985.
