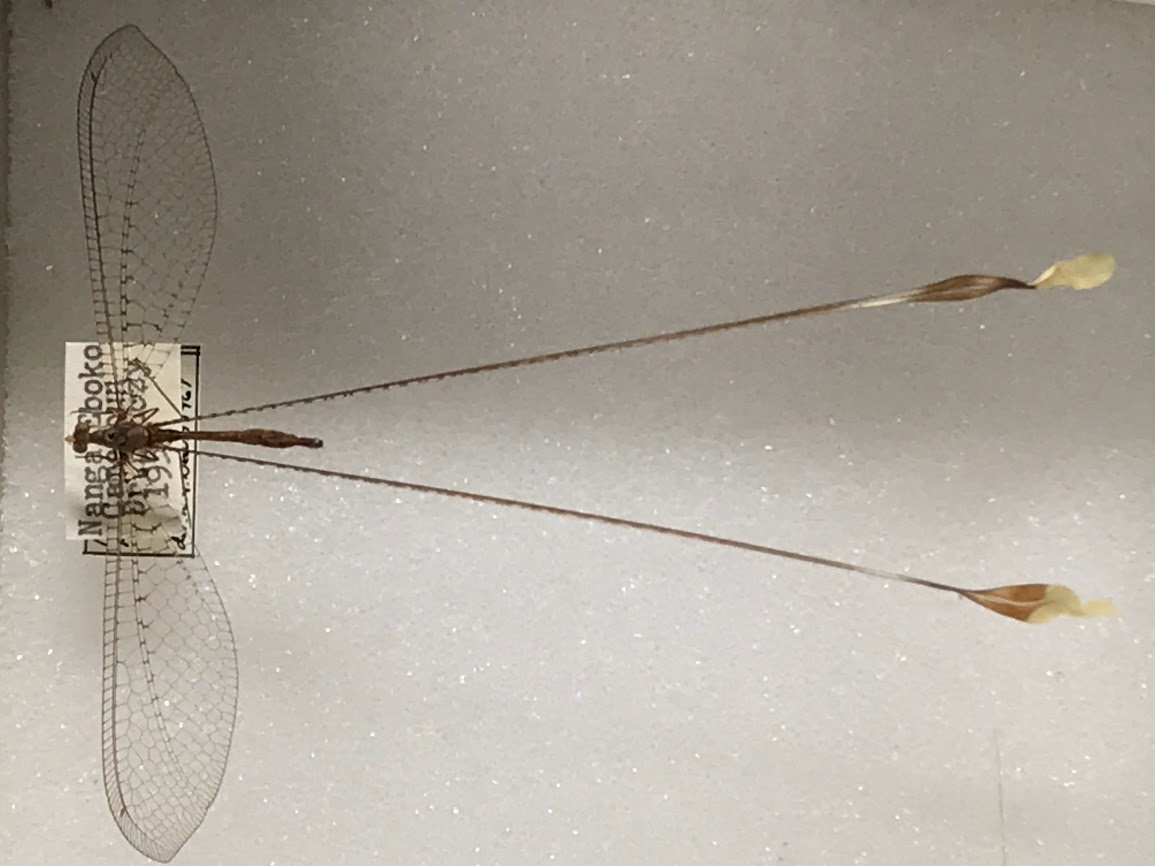
- Pinned Nemopistha hennini

Scientific classification
- Domain: Eukaryota
- Kingdom: Animalia
- Phylum: Arthropoda
- Class: Insecta
- Order: Neuroptera
- Family: Nemopteridae
- Genus: Nemopistha
- Species: N. hennini

Binomial name
- Nemopistha hennini Navas, 1911

= Nemopistha hennini =

Species of Neuroptera

Nemopistha hennini is a Neuropteran insect species described by Luisa Eugenia Navas in 1911, which is found in the Congo Basin. N. hennini is part of the genus Nemopistha and the family Nemopteridae. No subspecies are listed in the Catalog of Life.
