= Myrceugenia colchaguensis =

Scientific classification
- Kingdom: Plantae
- Clade: Tracheophytes
- Clade: Angiosperms
- Clade: Eudicots
- Clade: Rosids
- Order: Myrtales
- Family: Myrtaceae
- Genus: Myrceugenia
- Species: M. colchaguensis

Binomial name
- Myrceugenia colchaguensis (Phil.) Navas

Species of plant

Myrceugenia colchaguensis is a species of small evergreen tree in the genus Myrceugenia of the family Myrtaceae. It is endemic to Chile where it is found in the coastal mountain range at altitudes below 400 m (1,312 ft). Common names by which this tree is known include colchaguillo, arrayan de colchagua and lumilla.

== Description ==
Myrceugenia colchaguensis is a large shrub or small evergreen tree growing to a height of about 4 m (13 ft). The bark is pale brown, smooth at first but later becoming fissured. The young shoots are densely hairy but this pubescence is lost on older stems and leaves. The opposite pairs of short-stalked leaves are 0.7 to 2.0 cm (0.3 to 0.8 in) long and 0.4 to 1.2 centimetres (0.16 to 0.47 in) wide. They have entire margins and blunt or rounded tips and rounded bases, being dark green above and pale green beneath. The flowers grow singly in the axes of the leaves. The four calyx lobes are covered in dense yellow hairs and the four petals are white. Each flower has a cluster of about two hundred stamens and a single, slightly longer style. The berries are green at first but ripen to yellow and orange with a diameter of about 7 mm (0.3 in). The flowering period is January and February and the fruits ripen in October and November.

== Distribution and habitat ==
Myrceugenia colchaguensis is endemic to the coastal region of Chile and has a distribution that extends from the province of Valparaiso to Cautín. Although this range is wide, it is also extremely patchy as it is present only in a number of small subpopulations in coastal areas, one or two in the Chilean Central Valley and possibly one in the Andes. Its altitudinal range is 50 to 400 m (164 to 1,312 ft). It prefers humid habitats and usually grows among other members of the family Myrtaceae. It is only present in about ten locations and is considered "critically endangered".
