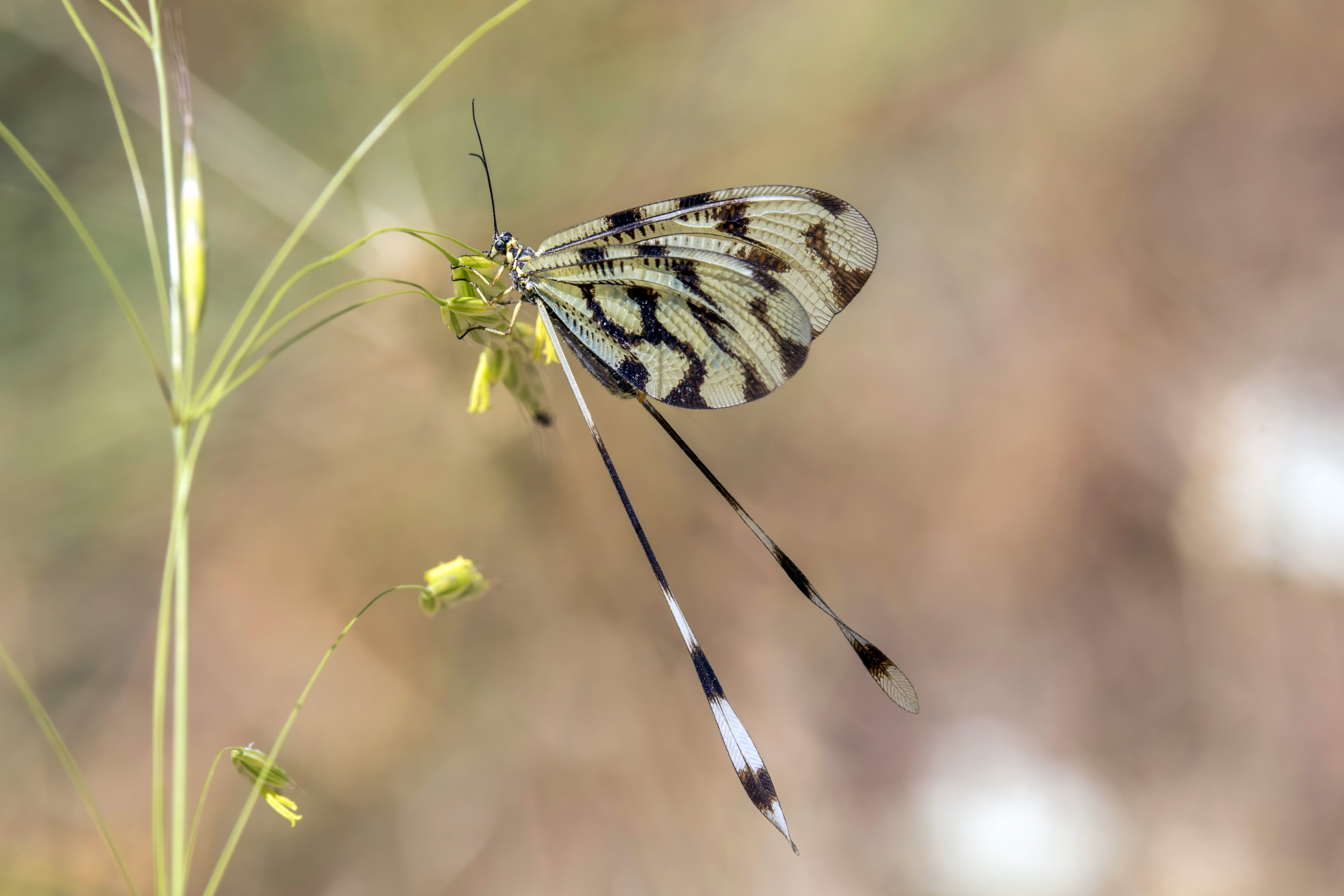

Scientific classification
- Kingdom: Animalia
- Phylum: Arthropoda
- Clade: Pancrustacea
- Class: Insecta
- Order: Neuroptera
- Family: Nemopteridae
- Genus: Nemoptera
- Species: N. sinuata

Binomial name
- Nemoptera sinuata (Olivier, 1811)

= Nemoptera sinuata =

Species of lacewing

Nemoptera sinuata is a diurnal species of spoonwing lacewing or thread-winged lacewing within the spoonwing family Nemopteridae. It is a Balkan-Anatolian species distributed throughout the Balkan Peninsula, specifically found in Bulgaria, East Thrace, Greece, and North Macedonia and in Turkey. They inhabit forests and open grasslands, with flights near river gorges as well.

Individuals are 16 mm in length with a wingspan of 55 mm.

== Life history ==
Nemoptera sinuata is primarily diurnal, the flight period lasts from mid-May to late June. They only emerge if conditions are above 17 °C with little to no wind.

It primarily feeds on pollen. Studies have shown that N. sinuata primarily feeds on the pollen of Alyssum murale, Cota austriaca, and Achillea coarctata.

Eggs are laid on the ground, females lay up to 70 eggs during the early morning. The eggs are dormant for 23–25 days until hatching. The larvae are unusual for other lacewings in that they are primarily herbivorous, rejecting other insect prey in favour of water and vegetable sap.

== Gallery ==
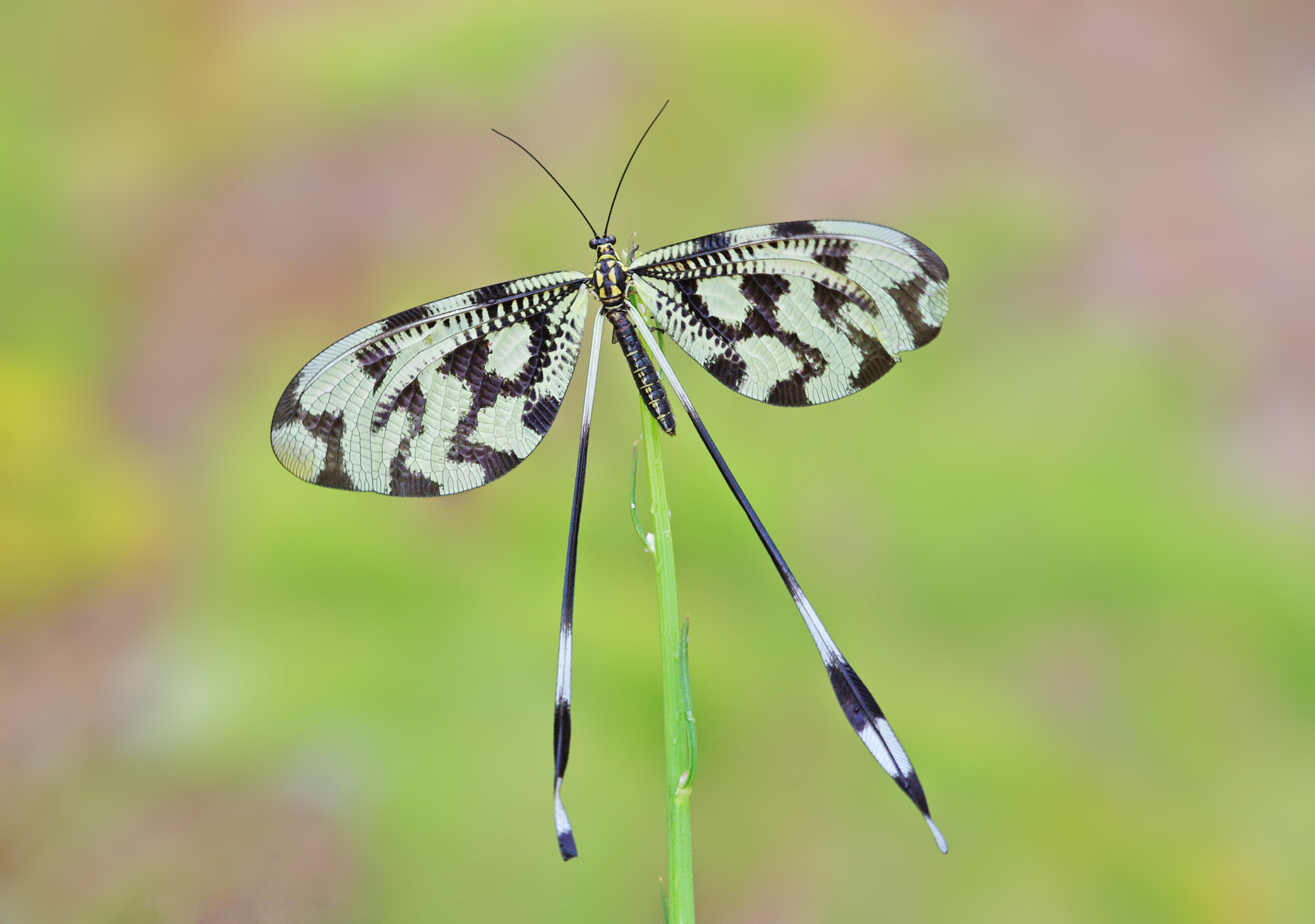

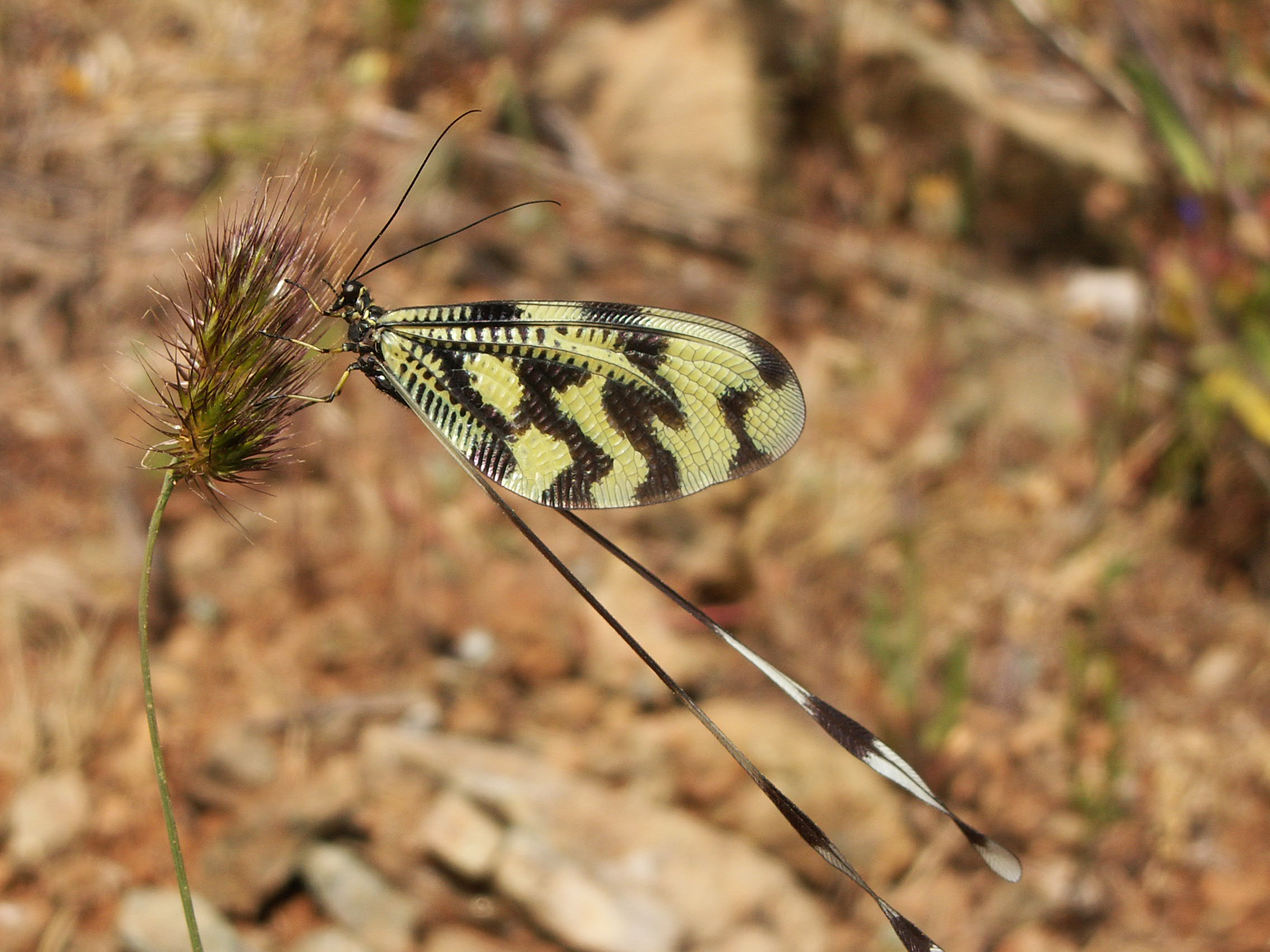
