= Chasmoptera mathewsi =

Scientific classification
- Domain: Eukaryota
- Kingdom: Animalia
- Phylum: Arthropoda
- Class: Insecta
- Order: Neuroptera
- Family: Nemopteridae
- Genus: Chasmoptera
- Species: C. mathewsi

Binomial name
- Chasmoptera mathewsi Koch, 1967

Species of insect

Chasmoptera mathewsi is an insect in the spoonwing family (Nemopteridae). found in Western Australia.

It was first described in 1967 by Lucien Everard Koch and known only the holotype, a male specimen from Peron Peninsula, Shark Bay, WA.

The adults are diurnal flying insects, and the larvae are predatory.
