= Hugo Gunckel Lüer =

Chilean pharmacist, botanist, and university professor

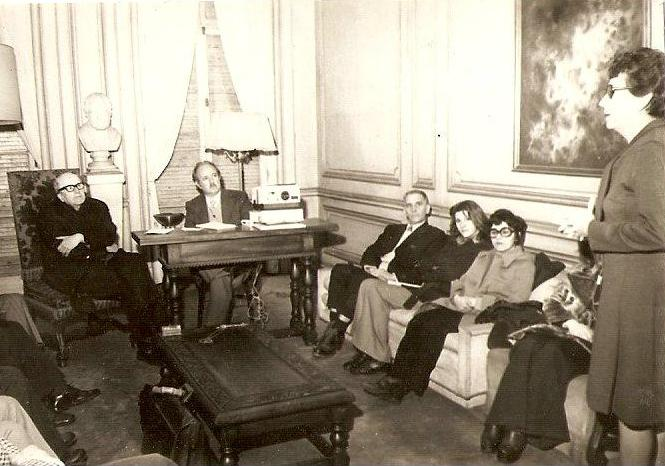
Gunckel (left behind) during a speech by L.E. Navas

Hugo Gunckel Lüer (August 10, 1901 – July 17, 1997) was a Chilean pharmacist, botanist, and university professor.

== Life ==
Gunckel was born in Valdivia. His primary and secondary studies were at the Colegio Alemán (founded by Carlos Anwandter) and in the Liceo de Hombres high school, entering the Universidad de Concepción in 1921, from which he got a degree in pharmacy.

As assistant of botany to the Prof. Alcibíades Santa Cruz, he demonstrated his interest in nature, stimulated by his parents who offered him frequent excursions that allowed him to observe nature, plants, and their development. Later, the study of plants, their properties, and life conditions became a passion.

After graduating he worked as a professional in Talca in the pharmacy of Guillermo Kuschel, the distinguished trade union and industrial director, one of the founding partners of the Laboratorio Geka. Later Gunckel returned to Valdivia to serve as the pharmaceutical head of the Railroad Zone IV, work which was later suppressed.

Gunckel moved to Corral, where he started a pharmacy but the near-virgin landscape that surrounded this port, rich in forests, ferns and grasses, made him a collector of plant specimens. In the 1930th he issued the exsiccata-like series Plantae Chilenses exsiccatae (Pflanzen aus Chile). In 1940 he moved to Temuco, where he became the director of the Museo Araucano (today the Museo Regional de la Araucanía). In 1943 he was elected the first president of the Temuco Regional Council of the College of Pharmacists of Chile (Consejo Regional en Temuco del Colegio de Farmacéuticos de Chile), which was led by Victor M. Cereceda. In 1946 he became the president of the School of Forestry Engineers (Escuela de Ingenieros Forestales), the first establishment of the specialty created in Chile. However, he continued studying and wrote articles for the daily Austral, other newspapers in the region and scientific journals. He was founding member of the Academia de Ciencias Naturales, which he was president of later for 12 years and for which he wrote articles they published in their journal over the course of 20 years. With Hans Niemeyer, he edited the "Revista Universitaria-Universidad Católica" or "Anales de la Academia de Ciencias Naturales."

On May 1, 1950 he moved to Santiago to fill the botany chair in the Facultad de Farmacia, which was directed by the professor Juan Ibáñez, who performed duties for UNESCO and thus was frequently travelling. His mission was the formation of the herbarium of the School of Chemistry and Pharmacy. At the same time, Gunckel taught classes at the Instituto Pedagógico de la Universidad de Chile, today the Universidad Metropolitana de Ciencias de la Educación, where he continued to serve until he retired in 1968. This body's journal Academia published some of his works related to botany and history (Gunckel 1982). He became an honorary member of the Sociedad Chilena de Historia y Geografía and a member of the Academia Chilena de la Lengua.

Hugo Gunckel was also the founder and subdirector of the Third Company of Firefighters of Corral.

He died in Santiago de Chile at the age of 96.

== Works ==
Books

- Helechos de Chile Monografías Anexos de los Anales de la Universidad de Chile, 245 pp.
- Bibliografía Moliniana Fondo Andrés Bello, 166 pp.

Articles

- (1948) "La floración de la quila y el coligüe en la Araucanía." Ciencia e Investigación 4: 91–95.
- (1953) "Plantas chilenas estudiadas por Linneo." Revista Universitaria (Chile) 38: 67-76
- (1959) "Nombres indígenas relacionados con la flora chilena." Facultad de Química y Farmacia, Universidad de Chile, Santiago de Chile,
- (1967) "Fitonimia atacameña, especialmente cunza." Anales de la Academia Chilena de Ciencias Naturales 52: 1 – 81
- (1972) "Plantas chilenas descritas como nuevos por Juan Ignacio Molina y sus concordancias con la nomenclatura botánica actual." Noticiario Mensual del Museo Nacional de Historia Natural, Año 17 (N° 197):3-11.
- (1979) "Vocablos populares técnicos relacionados con la industria del alerce" Noticiario Mensual del Museo Nacional de Historia Natural 274-275
- (1980) "Plantas magicas mapuche." Terra Ameriga 41:73-75.
- (with C. Munizaga, 1958) "Notas etnobotánicas del pueblo atacameño de Socaire, o etnobotánica de Socaire." Publicaciones del Centro de Estudios Antropológicos 5: 9-40.
- (1982). Significado de nombres genéricos de algunas plantas de la flora chilena. Academia N° 4. Academia Superior de Ciencias Pedagógicas. 157-180 Chloris chilensis vol. 9., Nº2
