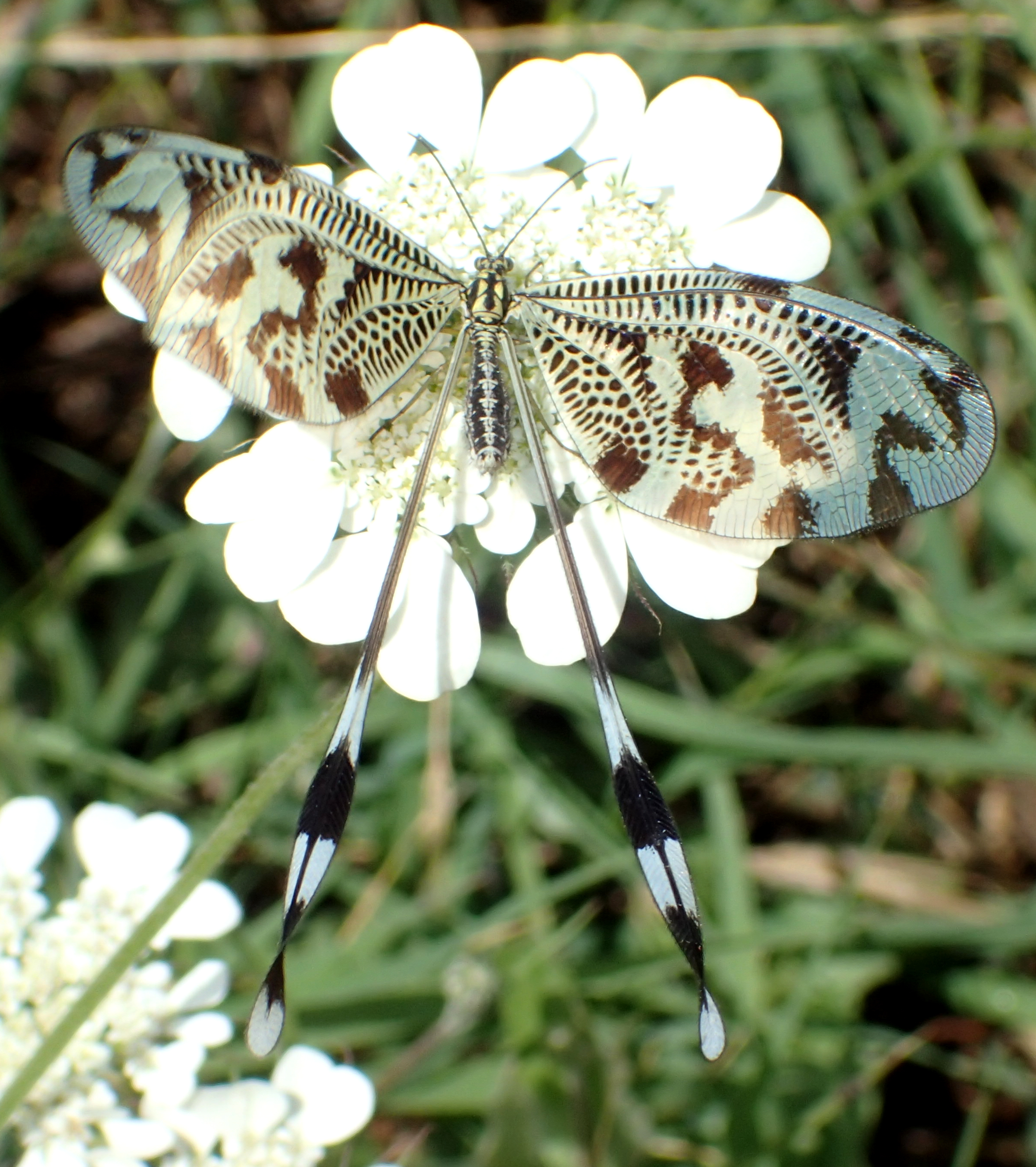

Scientific classification
- Kingdom: Animalia
- Phylum: Arthropoda
- Class: Insecta
- Order: Neuroptera
- Family: Nemopteridae
- Genus: Nemoptera
- Species: N. coa

Binomial name
- Nemoptera coa (Linnaeus, 1758)

Synonyms
- Panorpa coa (Leach, 1758)

= Nemoptera coa =

Species of insect

Nemoptera coa, sometimes referred to as the Grecian streamertail, is a species of lacewing within the family Nemopteridae, the spoonwing family. N. coa is native to Greece and East Thrace. There have been instances of individuals within Muğla Province within Turkey as well.

Individuals are often found in xeric Mediterranean phrygana as well as grasslands. N. coa individuals display activity during the daytime.
