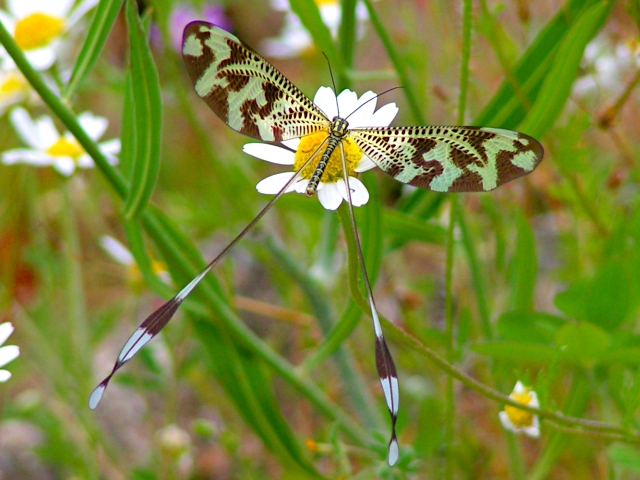

Scientific classification
- Kingdom: Animalia
- Phylum: Arthropoda
- Class: Insecta
- Order: Neuroptera
- Family: Nemopteridae
- Genus: Nemoptera
- Species: N. bipennis

Binomial name
- Nemoptera bipennis (Illiger, 1812)

Synonyms
- Nemoptera lusitanica (Leach, 1815)

= Nemoptera bipennis =

Species of insect

Nemoptera bipennis is a species of slow flying insect in the spoonwing family, Nemopteridae. It is found in Spain, Portugal, and France. Nemoptera bipennis lives in calcareous areas with low vegetation.

The adults are diurnal, and the larvae feed on ant larvae.
