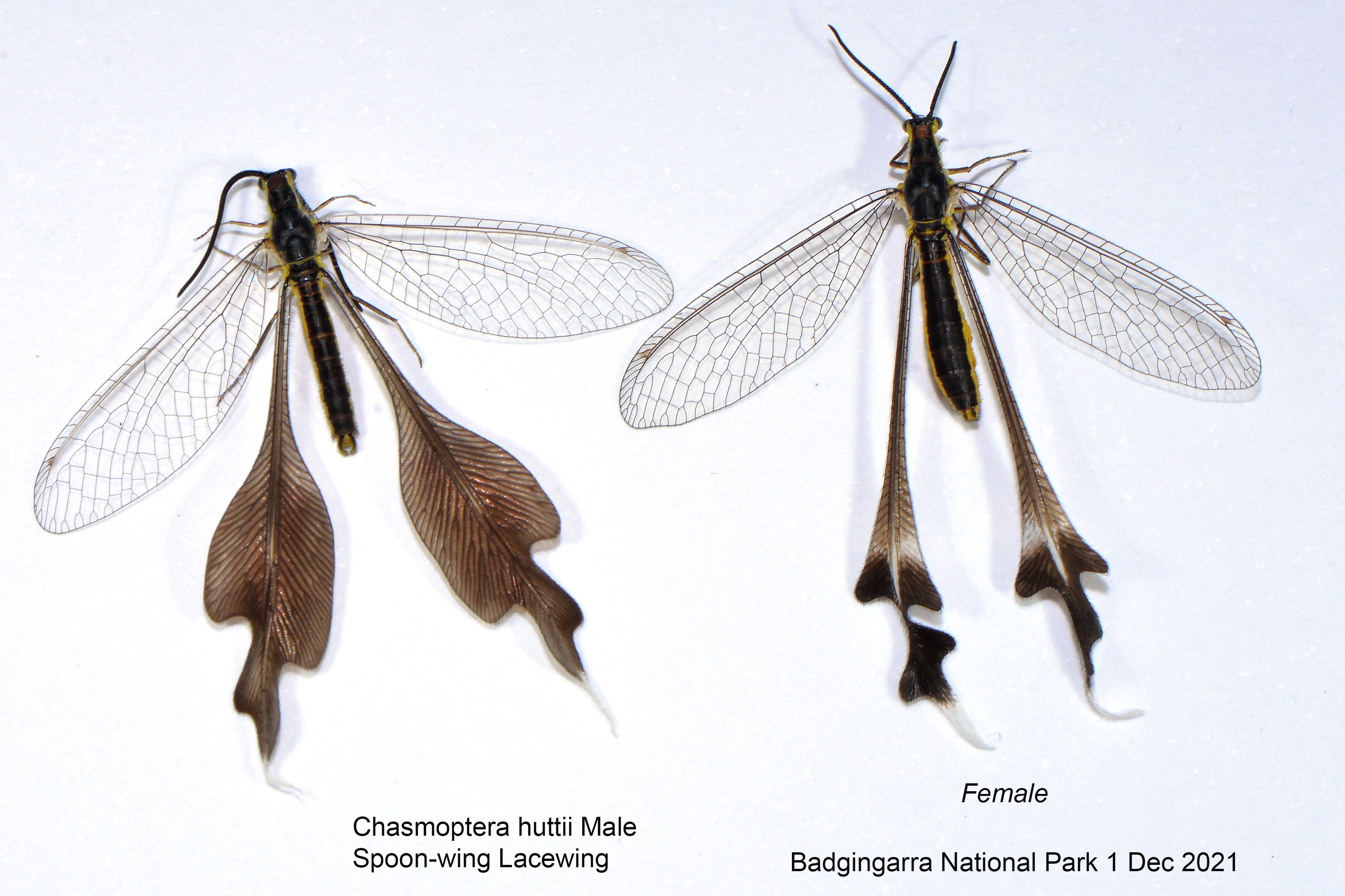

Scientific classification
- Kingdom: Animalia
- Phylum: Arthropoda
- Class: Insecta
- Order: Neuroptera
- Family: Nemopteridae
- Genus: Chasmoptera
- Species: C. huttii

Binomial name
- Chasmoptera huttii (Westwood, 1848)

Synonyms
- Nemoptera huttii Westwood, 1848

= Chasmoptera huttii =

Species of insect

Chasmoptera huttii is an insect in the spoonwing family (Nemopteridae). found in Western Australia.

It was first described in 1848 by John Obadiah Westwood as Nemoptera huttii. The original species epithet, Huttii, honours John Hutt, governor of Western Australia (1839–1846). There is little peer-reviewed research on them in recent years, but thesis work on them is as recent as 2021.

The adults are diurnal flying insects.

== Description ==
Chasmoptera huttii can be identified as neuropterans by their densely veined forewings with especially prominent radial veins. From there, long hindwings angled toward their abdomens classify them as nemopteridae, or spoonwings. Setting this species apart from other spoonwings is the asymmetrical, flared end of the hindwing, wider in the male and more detailed in the female.

== Habitat and Distribution ==
Chasmoptera huttii is endemic to Western Australia, and is the region's only genus of spoonwing neuropteran. For the most part, their northern reach is the coastline of Shark Bay, the southern coastline being Harvey. They reach as far East inland as Bullfinch.

== Gallery ==
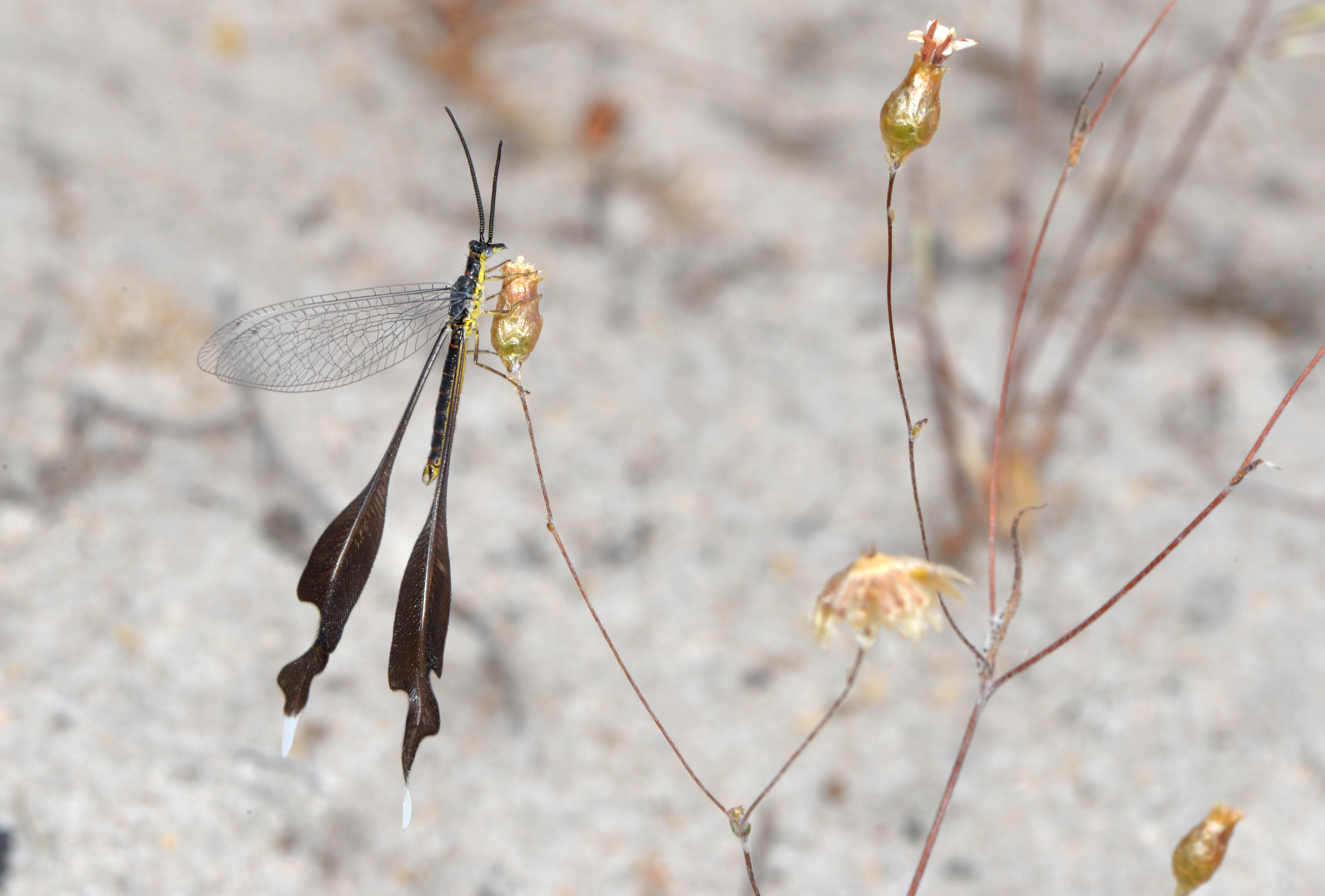

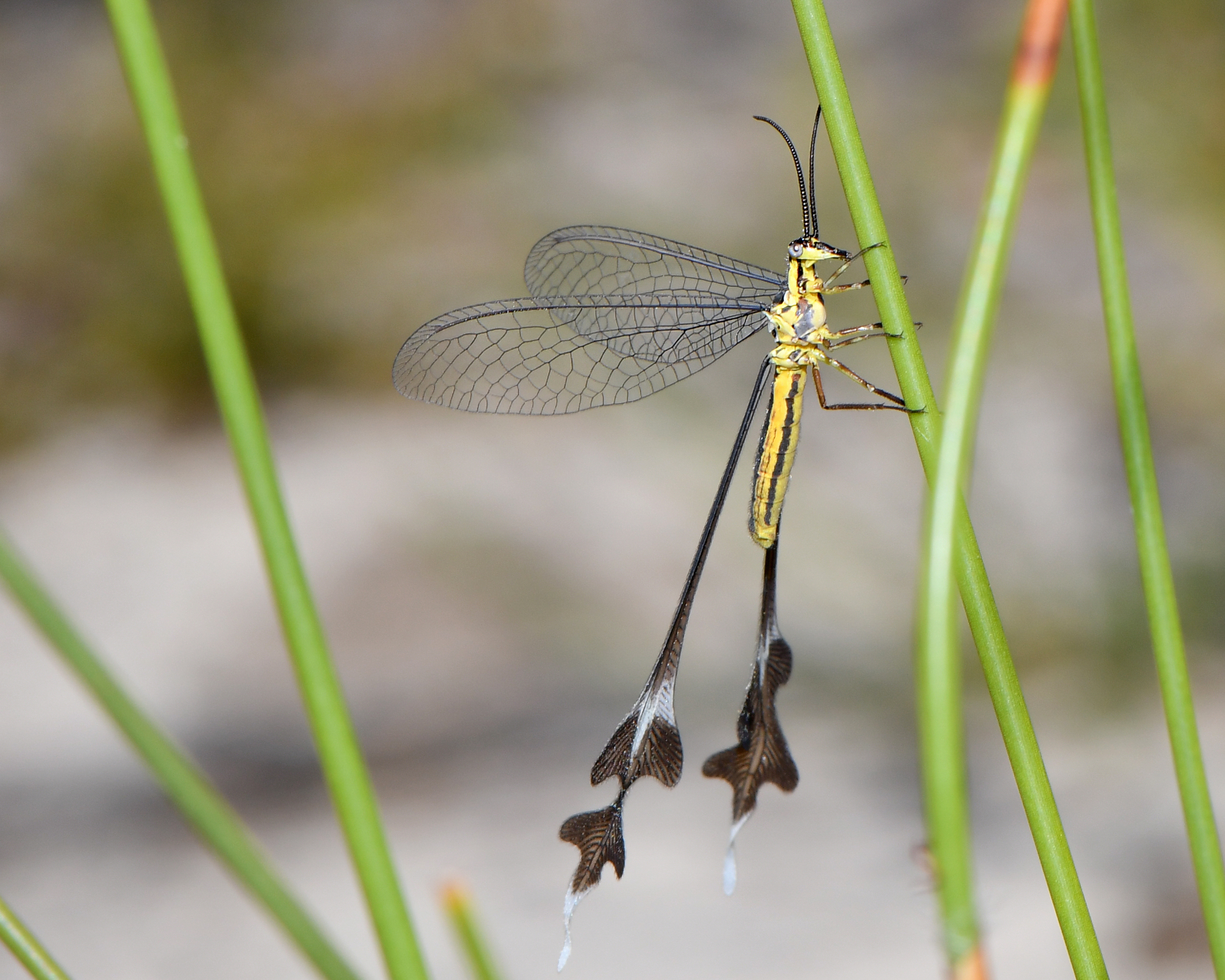
Moore River NP

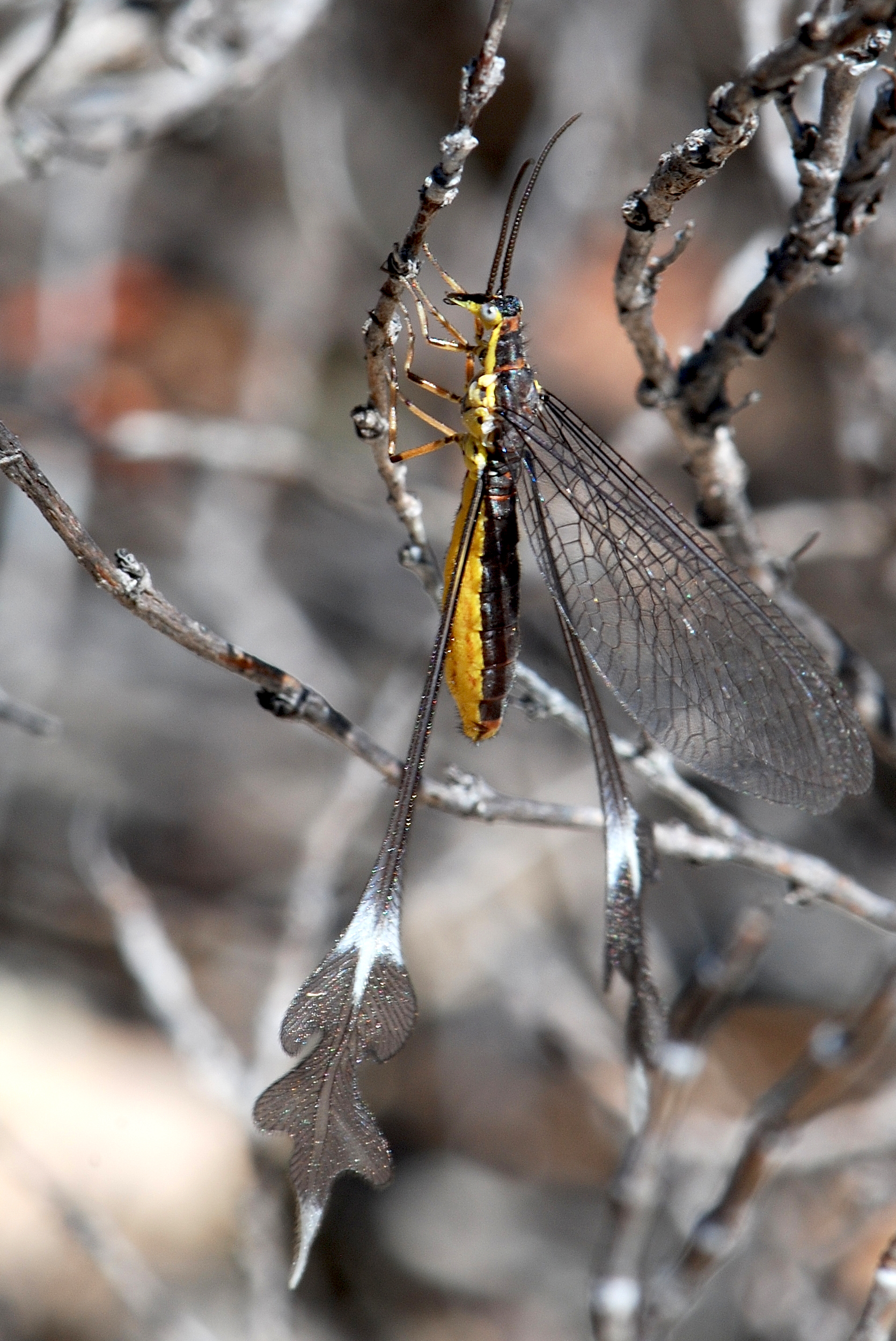
