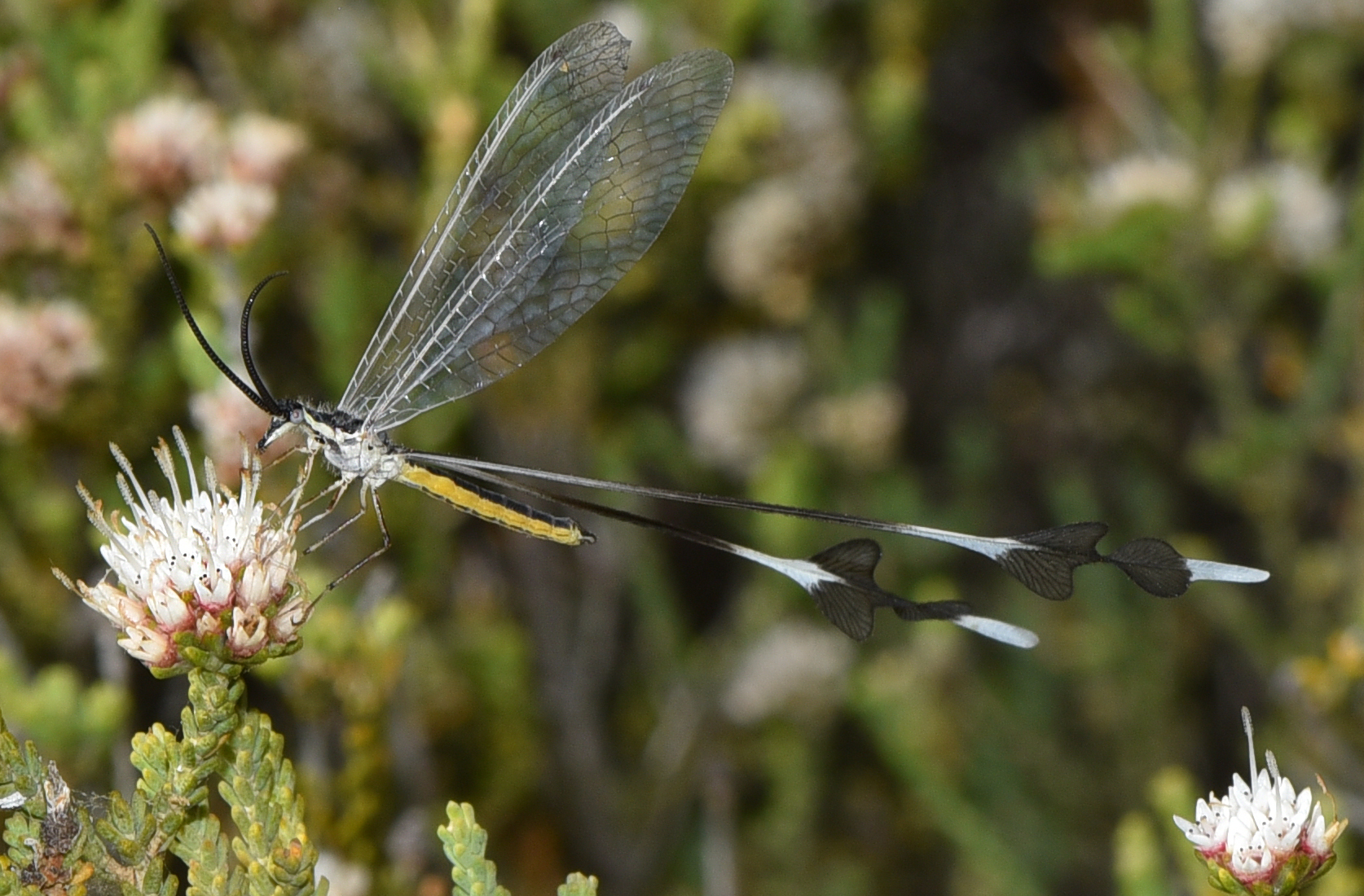
- feeding on a Darwinia sp., near Cunderdin

Scientific classification
- Domain: Eukaryota
- Kingdom: Animalia
- Phylum: Arthropoda
- Class: Insecta
- Order: Neuroptera
- Family: Nemopteridae
- Genus: Chasmoptera
- Species: C. superba

Binomial name
- Chasmoptera superba Tillyard, 1925

= Chasmoptera superba =

Species of insect

Chasmoptera superba is an insect in the spoonwing family (Nemopteridae). endemic to Western Australia.

It was first described in 1925 by Robert John Tillyard.

The adults are diurnal flying insects. The larvae are predatory.
