= Myrceugenia kleinii =

Conservation status
- Vulnerable (IUCN 2.3)

Scientific classification
- Kingdom: Plantae
- Clade: Tracheophytes
- Clade: Angiosperms
- Clade: Eudicots
- Clade: Rosids
- Order: Myrtales
- Family: Myrtaceae
- Genus: Myrceugenia
- Species: M. kleinii

Binomial name
- Myrceugenia kleinii Legrand & Kausel

Species of flowering plant

Myrceugenia kleinii is a species of plant in the family Myrtaceae.

The plant is endemic to the Atlantic Forest ecoregion in southeastern Brazil.
