= Myrceugenia correifolia =

Conservation status
- Endangered (IUCN 3.1)

Scientific classification
- Kingdom: Plantae
- Clade: Tracheophytes
- Clade: Angiosperms
- Clade: Eudicots
- Clade: Rosids
- Order: Myrtales
- Family: Myrtaceae
- Genus: Myrceugenia
- Species: M. correifolia

Binomial name
- Myrceugenia correifolia (Hook. & Arn.) O.Berg

Synonyms
- Eugenia correifolia Hook. & Arn.; Eugenia maritima Barnéoud, nom. illeg. homonym. post.; Eugenia thalassaia O.Berg; Luma correifolia (Hook. & Arn.) A.Gray; Luma thalassaia (O.Berg) Burret; Myrceugenia johowii Gusinde; Myrceugenia maritima Johow; Myrceugenia thalassaia (O.Berg) Gusinde ex Fuentes

Species of shrub

Myrceugenia correifolia is a species of evergreen woody flowering shrub belonging to the myrtle family, Myrtaceae. The common name of this plant is petrillo. The species is endemic to north-central Chile, including within the La Campana National Park.

== See also ==
- Myrceugenia exsucca
