= Myrceugenia brevipedicellata =

Conservation status
- Endangered (IUCN 3.1)

Scientific classification
- Kingdom: Plantae
- Clade: Tracheophytes
- Clade: Angiosperms
- Clade: Eudicots
- Clade: Rosids
- Order: Myrtales
- Family: Myrtaceae
- Genus: Myrceugenia
- Species: M. brevipedicellata

Binomial name
- Myrceugenia brevipedicellata (Burret) D.Legrand & Kausel

Synonyms
- Luma brevipedicellata Burret

Species of flowering plant

Myrceugenia brevipedicellata is a species of flowering plant in the family Myrtaceae. It is a shrub endemic to southern Minas Gerais and São Paulo states in southeastern Brazil.
