= Myrceugenia myrcioides =

Conservation status
- Least Concern (IUCN 3.1)

Scientific classification
- Kingdom: Plantae
- Clade: Tracheophytes
- Clade: Angiosperms
- Clade: Eudicots
- Clade: Rosids
- Order: Myrtales
- Family: Myrtaceae
- Genus: Myrceugenia
- Species: M. myrcioides

Binomial name
- Myrceugenia myrcioides (Cambess.) O.Berg

Synonyms
- Synonymy: Eugenia acrophylla O.Berg; Eugenia complanata Gardner; Eugenia estrellensis O.Berg; Eugenia humilis Vell., tentatively listed as a synonym; Eugenia hypericifolia Gardner; Eugenia myrcioides Cambess.; Eugenia obtusiflora Kiaersk.; Luma acrophylla (O.Berg) Burret; Luma estrellensis (O.Berg) Burret; Luma myrcioides (Cambess.) Burret; Luma obtusiflora (Kiaersk.) Burret; Luma ulei Burret; Myrceugenia acrophylla (O.Berg) D.Legrand; Myrceugenia acrophylla var. ulei (Burret) D.Legrand; Myrceugenia estrellensis (O.Berg) D.Legrand & Kausel; Myrceugenia ferreira-limana R.M.Klein & D.Legrand; Myrceugenia myrcioides var. acrophylla (O.Berg) D.Legrand; Myrceugenia myrcioides var. hypericifolia (Gardner) D.Legrand; Myrceugenia myrcioides var. loefgreniana Mattos; Myrceugenia myrcioides var. paranensis D.Legrand; Myrceugenia myrcioides var. ulei (Burret) D.Legrand; Myrceugenia paranaguensis Mattos

Species of flowering plant

Myrceugenia myrcioides is a species of plant in the family Myrtaceae. It is endemic to eastern and southern Brazil.
