= Myrceugenia scutellata =

Conservation status
- Least Concern (IUCN 3.1)

Scientific classification
- Kingdom: Plantae
- Clade: Tracheophytes
- Clade: Angiosperms
- Clade: Eudicots
- Clade: Rosids
- Order: Myrtales
- Family: Myrtaceae
- Genus: Myrceugenia
- Species: M. scutellata

Binomial name
- Myrceugenia scutellata C.D.Legrand

Species of flowering plant

Myrceugenia scutellata is a species of flowering plant in the family Myrtaceae. It is a tree endemic to the Atlantic Forest ecoregion in southern and southeastern Brazil.
