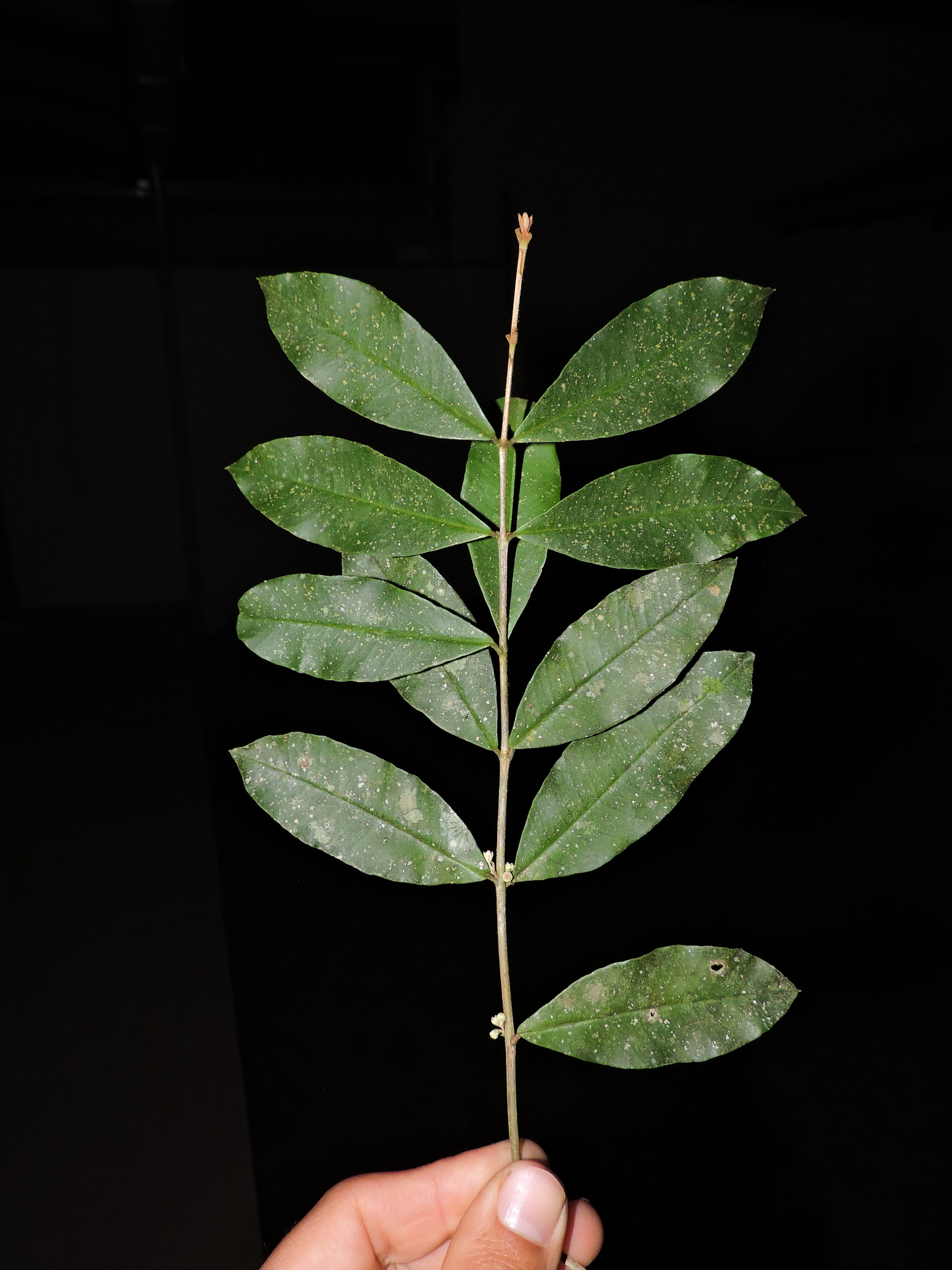

Conservation status
- Least Concern (IUCN 3.1)

Scientific classification
- Kingdom: Plantae
- Clade: Tracheophytes
- Clade: Angiosperms
- Clade: Eudicots
- Clade: Rosids
- Order: Myrtales
- Family: Myrtaceae
- Genus: Myrceugenia
- Species: M. campestris

Binomial name
- Myrceugenia campestris (DC.) D.Legrand & Kausel

Synonyms
- Eugenia campestris DC.; Eugenia campestris var. nervulosa Spring; Eugenia distans O.Berg; Luma campestris (DC.) Burret; Luma distans (O.Berg) Burret; Myrceugenia campestris var. distans (O.Berg) D.Legrand; Myrceugenia distans (O.Berg) D.Legrand & Kausel; Psidium paraibicum Wawra

= Myrceugenia campestris =

Species of flowering plant

Myrceugenia campestris is a species of flowering plant in the family Myrtaceae. It is a shrub or tree endemic to southern and southeastern Brazil.
