= Myrceugenia rufa =

Scientific classification
- Kingdom: Plantae
- Clade: Tracheophytes
- Clade: Angiosperms
- Clade: Eudicots
- Clade: Rosids
- Order: Myrtales
- Family: Myrtaceae
- Genus: Myrceugenia
- Species: M. rufa

Binomial name
- Myrceugenia rufa (Colla) Skottsb. ex Kausel.

Species of plant

Myrceugenia rufa is a species of shrub in the genus Myrceugenia of the family Myrtaceae. It is endemic to Chile, where it grows in forest remnants near the coast and is considered "endangered".

== Description ==
Myrceugenia rufa is an evergreen shrub growing to a height of about 2 m (6 ft 7 in). The young stems are densely pubescent. The small, opposite leaves have hairy petioles and are oval or oblong with entire margins. They have rounded apices and bases and are yellowish-green above and pale green below. The flowers are solitary or in groups of two or three in the axils of the leaves. The flower stems are densely pubescent, the petals are white and there is a boss of sixty to one hundred stamens and a single style. The flowers are followed by berries 4 to 8 millimetres (0.16 to 0.31 in) in diameter which are green at first but later turn yellow and then orange. The flowering period is from August to October and the fruits mature in February and March.

== Distribution and habitat ==
Myrceugenia rufa is endemic to Chile where it is restricted to coastal areas from Coquimbo Region southwards to San Antonio Province. Its altitudinal range is 10 to 700 metres (33 to 2,297 ft), and it grows on coastal cliffs or within about 15 kilometres (9.3 mi) of the coast, usually occurring in deep creaks and inaccessible places in remnants of forested areas. It is often found growing among other species of myrtle. The fruits are often attacked by insects which feed on the flesh and seeds. It is an uncommon species and its conservation status is considered to be "endangered".
