= Myrceugenia miersiana =

Conservation status
- Near Threatened (IUCN 2.3)

Scientific classification
- Kingdom: Plantae
- Clade: Tracheophytes
- Clade: Angiosperms
- Clade: Eudicots
- Clade: Rosids
- Order: Myrtales
- Family: Myrtaceae
- Genus: Myrceugenia
- Species: M. miersiana

Binomial name
- Myrceugenia miersiana (Gardn.) Legr. & Kraus.

Species of flowering plant

Myrceugenia miersiana is a species of plant in the family Myrtaceae. It is endemic to Brazil.
