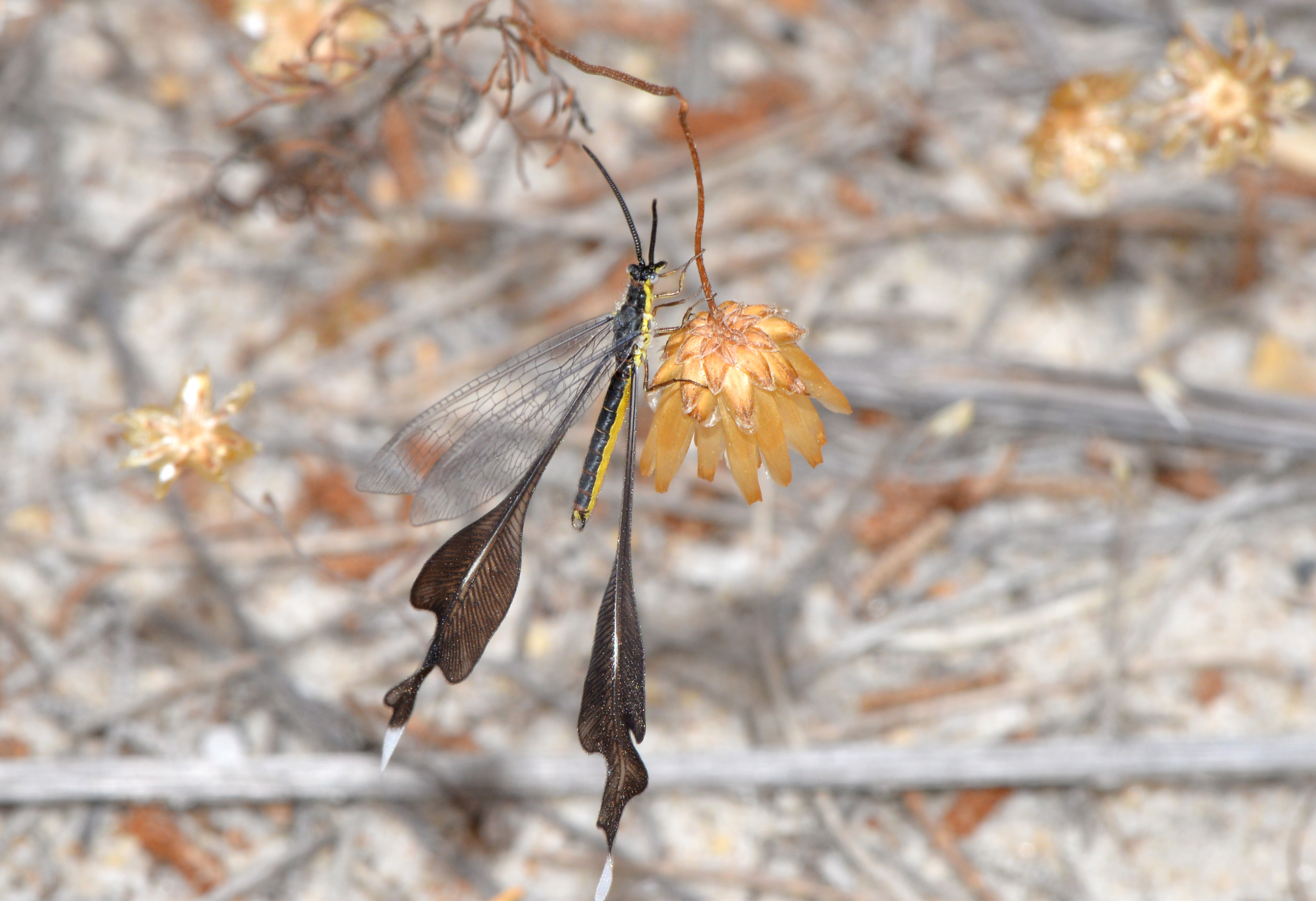
- Chasmoptera huttii

Scientific classification
- Domain: Eukaryota
- Kingdom: Animalia
- Phylum: Arthropoda
- Class: Insecta
- Order: Neuroptera
- Family: Nemopteridae
- Genus: Chasmoptera; Kirby, 1900

= Chasmoptera =

Family of insects

Chasmoptera is a genus in the Nemopteridae (the spoonwing family of insects). The genus, which consists of three species, is wholly confined to Western Australia.

The genus was first described by William Forsell Kirby in 1900, and the type species is Chasmoptera huttii.

A key feature of Chasmoptera is the "elaborate extended hindwings, with apical dilations arranged in a “ribbon” or “spoon” shape".

== Description ==
Kirby describes the genus as follows (but only lists the one species, Chasmoptera huttii):

Antennas very thick; beak prominent: hind wings only one and a half times as long as the fore wings; fore wings hyaline, except a slightly marked pterostigma; hind wings wholly dark except at the extremity and on the median line in the middle of the principal lobe, which expands very broadly on each side, occupying the third quarter of the wing; at the .base it expands gradually, and at the extremity it is truncated, the angles, however, being rounded off; from the central line a number of bifid nervures diverge on each side. This is followed by a second smaller lobe on each side, and a broad terminal projection, white on the apical half.

Later work uses both wing and genital morphology to distinguish both species and genera.

== Species ==
- Chasmoptera huttii (Westwood, 1848)
- Chasmoptera mathewsi Koch, 1967
- Chasmoptera superba Tillyard, 1925
