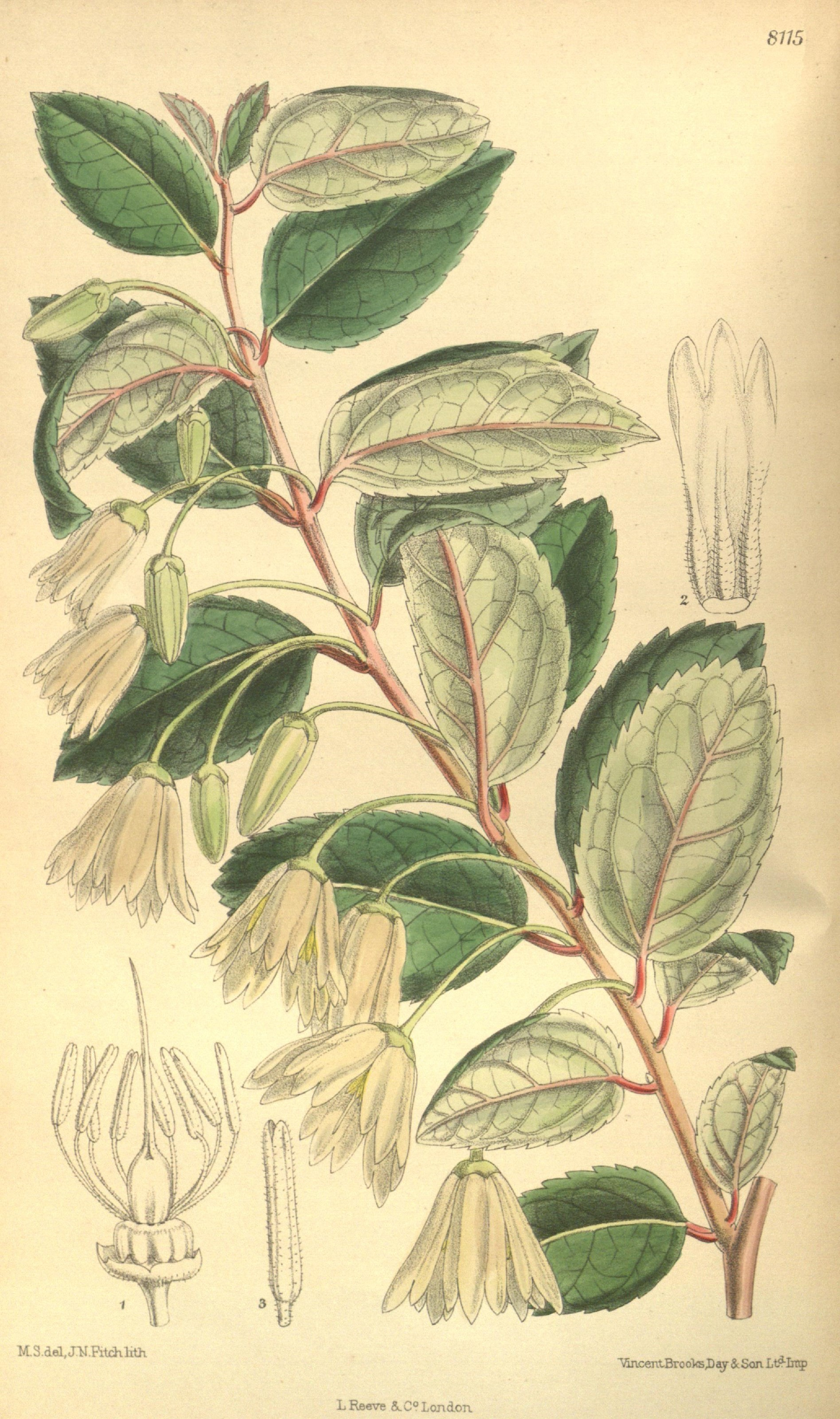

Scientific classification
- Kingdom: Plantae
- Clade: Tracheophytes
- Clade: Angiosperms
- Clade: Eudicots
- Clade: Rosids
- Order: Myrtales
- Family: Myrtaceae
- Genus: Myrceugenia
- Species: M. planipes

Binomial name
- Myrceugenia planipes (Hook. & Arn.) O.Berg

= Myrceugenia planipes =

Species of tree

Myrceugenia planipes, known as Valdivia's patagua (Patagua de Valdivia) is an evergreen found in Chile and Argentina from 37 to 45°S. It occurs between 400 (1300) and 700 m (2300 ft) above sea level.

== Description ==
It is an evergreen small tree or shrub that measures up to 8 m (26 ft) tall, smooth grey bark, young shoots are densely hairy, opposite and elliptical leaves with the entire margin, acuminate apex and wedge-shaped to acuminate base. The leaves are 2.2–8 cm long and 1.3 cm wide, glossy green and glabrous above and pale green and hairy below when young. Petioles are fluted 2–6 mm long. Midrib prominent underside. The flowers are hermaphrodite, solitary and axillary or clustered in axillary inflorescences in groups of 2-3 flowers, 4 sepals fused at the base and 4 with free falling white petals . The stamens are very numerous: they vary 120-220 and 7–12 mm long, a style about 5–8 mm long. The fruit is a black sub-globose berry, about 0.8–1 cm diameter . Within it there are 3-4 seeds about 4–5 mm long.

== Uses ==
It is used in popular medicine as remedy for skin diseases.

== Etymology ==
It is the fusion of the names of the genera Myrcia and Eugenia. It has been planted in Spain.
