= Myrceugenia bracteosa =

Conservation status
- Vulnerable (IUCN 2.3)

Scientific classification
- Kingdom: Plantae
- Clade: Tracheophytes
- Clade: Angiosperms
- Clade: Eudicots
- Clade: Rosids
- Order: Myrtales
- Family: Myrtaceae
- Genus: Myrceugenia
- Species: M. bracteosa

Binomial name
- Myrceugenia bracteosa (DC.) D.Legrand & Kausel

Synonyms
- Synonymy: Eugenia anceps O.Berg; Eugenia brachymischa Kiaersk.; Eugenia brachymischa f. pedunculata Kiaersk.; Eugenia bracteosa DC.; Eugenia expallens O.Berg; Eugenia ibitipocensis Cambess.; Eugenia montana Cambess., nom. illeg. homonym. post.; Luma anceps (O.Berg) Burret; Luma brachymischa (Kiaersk.) Burret; Luma bracteosa (DC.) Burret; Luma expallens (O.Berg) Burret; Luma montana Burret; Myrceugenia bracteosa var. australis D.Legrand; Myrceugenia bracteosa var. expallens (O.Berg) D.Legrand; Myrceugenia bracteosa var. ibitipocensis (Cambess.) D.Legrand; Myrceugenia cambessedesiana D.Legrand & Kausel; Myrceugenia monticola D.Legrand & Kausel, nom. illeg.

Species of plant

Myrceugenia bracteosa is a species of flowering plant in the family Myrtaceae. It is a shrub or tree endemic to southeastern Brazil.
