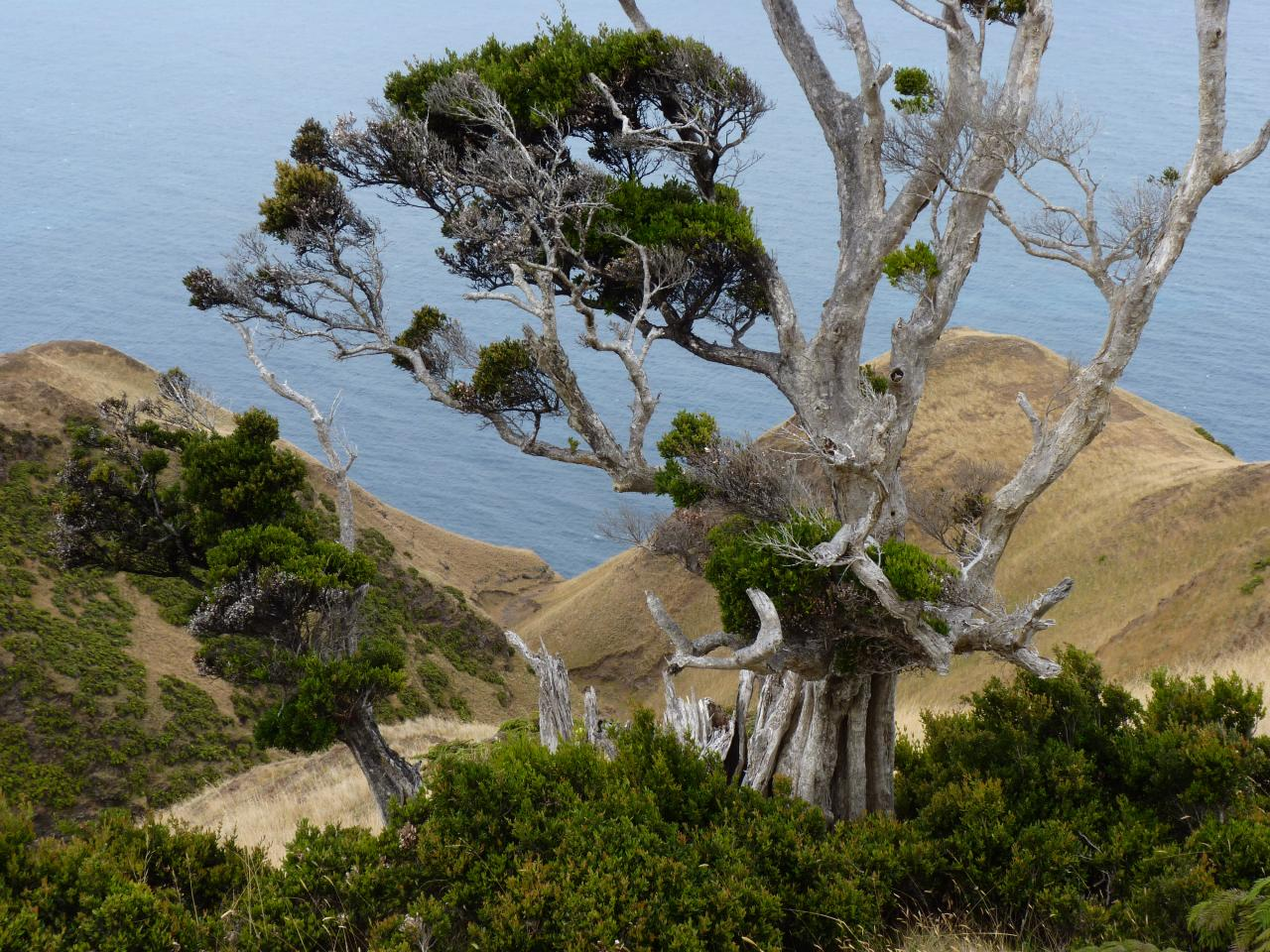

Conservation status
- Endangered (IUCN 3.1)

Scientific classification
- Kingdom: Plantae
- Clade: Tracheophytes
- Clade: Angiosperms
- Clade: Eudicots
- Clade: Rosids
- Order: Myrtales
- Family: Myrtaceae
- Genus: Myrceugenia
- Species: M. schulzei

Binomial name
- Myrceugenia schulzei Johow

Synonyms
- Luma schulzei (Johow) Burret

= Myrceugenia schulzei =

Species of flowering plant

Myrceugenia schulzei, commonly known as luma de Masafuera, is a species of flowering plant in the family Myrtaceae. It is a tree endemic to Alejandro Selkirk Island, of the Juan Fernández Islands archipelago in the Pacific Ocean, territory of the Republic of Chile. It is threatened by habitat loss.
