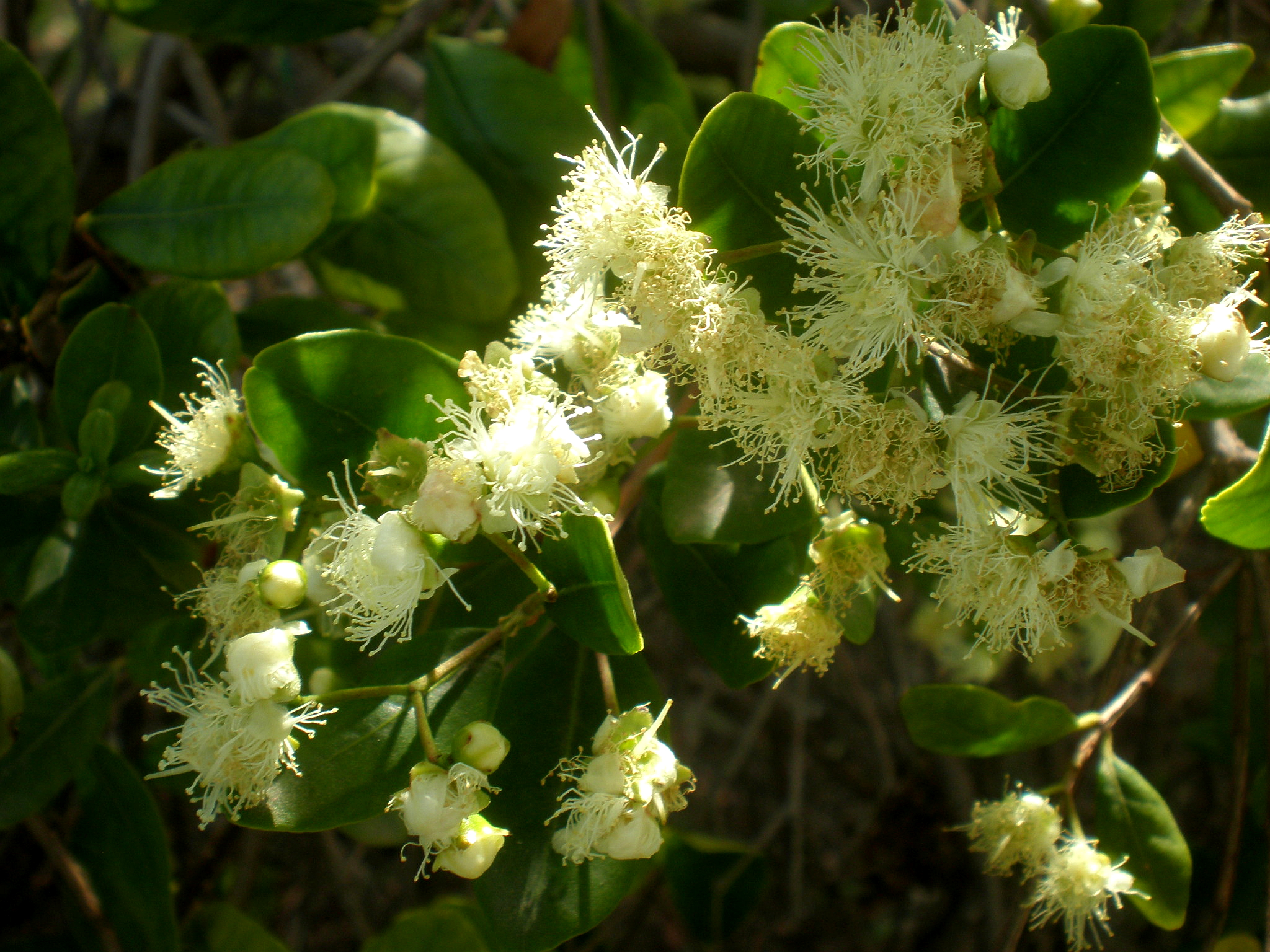

Conservation status
- Least Concern (IUCN 3.1)

Scientific classification
- Kingdom: Plantae
- Clade: Tracheophytes
- Clade: Angiosperms
- Clade: Eudicots
- Clade: Rosids
- Order: Myrtales
- Family: Myrtaceae
- Genus: Myrceugenia
- Species: M. exsucca

Binomial name
- Myrceugenia exsucca (DC.) O.Berg

Synonyms
- Synonymy: Eugenia exsucca DC.; Eugenia corralensis Phil.; Eugenia exsucca var. apiculata O.Berg; Eugenia exsucca var. patagua O.Berg; Eugenia exsucca var. peruviana O.Berg; Eugenia exsucca var. temu (Hook. & Arn.) O.Berg; Eugenia multiflora Hook. & Arn., nom. illeg. homonym. post.; Eugenia pitra O.Berg; Eugenia pitra var. angustifolia Hook. ex O.Berg; Eugenia temu Hook. & Arn.; Luma corralensis (Phil.) Burret; Luma exsucca (DC.) Burret; Luma pitra (O.Berg) Burret; Luma temu (Hook. & Arn.) A.Gray; Myrceugenia camphorata O.Berg; Myrceugenia exsucca var. apiculata (O.Berg) Reiche; Myrceugenia exsucca var. patagua (O.Berg) Reiche; Myrceugenia exsucca var. temu Reiche; Myrceugenia lechleriana O.Berg; Myrceugenia multiflora Kausel, nom. illeg. superfl.; Myrceugenia pitra (O.Berg) O.Berg; Myrceugenia pitra var. angustifolia Reiche; Myrtus camphorata (O.Berg) Baill.

= Myrceugenia exsucca =

Species of plant

Myrceugenia exsucca is a species of evergreen woody flowering plant in the Myrtle family, Myrtaceae. It is a tree native to southern and central Chile and southern Argentina in temperate South America. An example occurrence is within the La Campana National Park in central Chile. A common name for this tree is petra.

The IUCN Red List assesses the species as Least concern.

The species was first described as Eugenia exsucca by Augustin Pyramus de Candolle in 1828. In 1861 Otto Karl Berg placed the species in genus Myrceugenia as M. exsucca.

== See also ==
- Myrceugenia correifolia
