= Myrceugenia pilotantha =

Conservation status
- Vulnerable (IUCN 2.3)

Scientific classification
- Kingdom: Plantae
- Clade: Tracheophytes
- Clade: Angiosperms
- Clade: Eudicots
- Clade: Rosids
- Order: Myrtales
- Family: Myrtaceae
- Genus: Myrceugenia
- Species: M. pilotantha

Binomial name
- Myrceugenia pilotantha (Kiaersk.) Landrum

Synonyms
- Eugenia pilotantha Kiaersk.; Luma pilotantha (Kiaersk.) Burret

Species of flowering plant

Myrceugenia pilotantha is a species of flowering plant in the family Myrtaceae. It is a shrub or tree endemic to the Atlantic Forest ecoregion in southern and southeastern Brazil.
