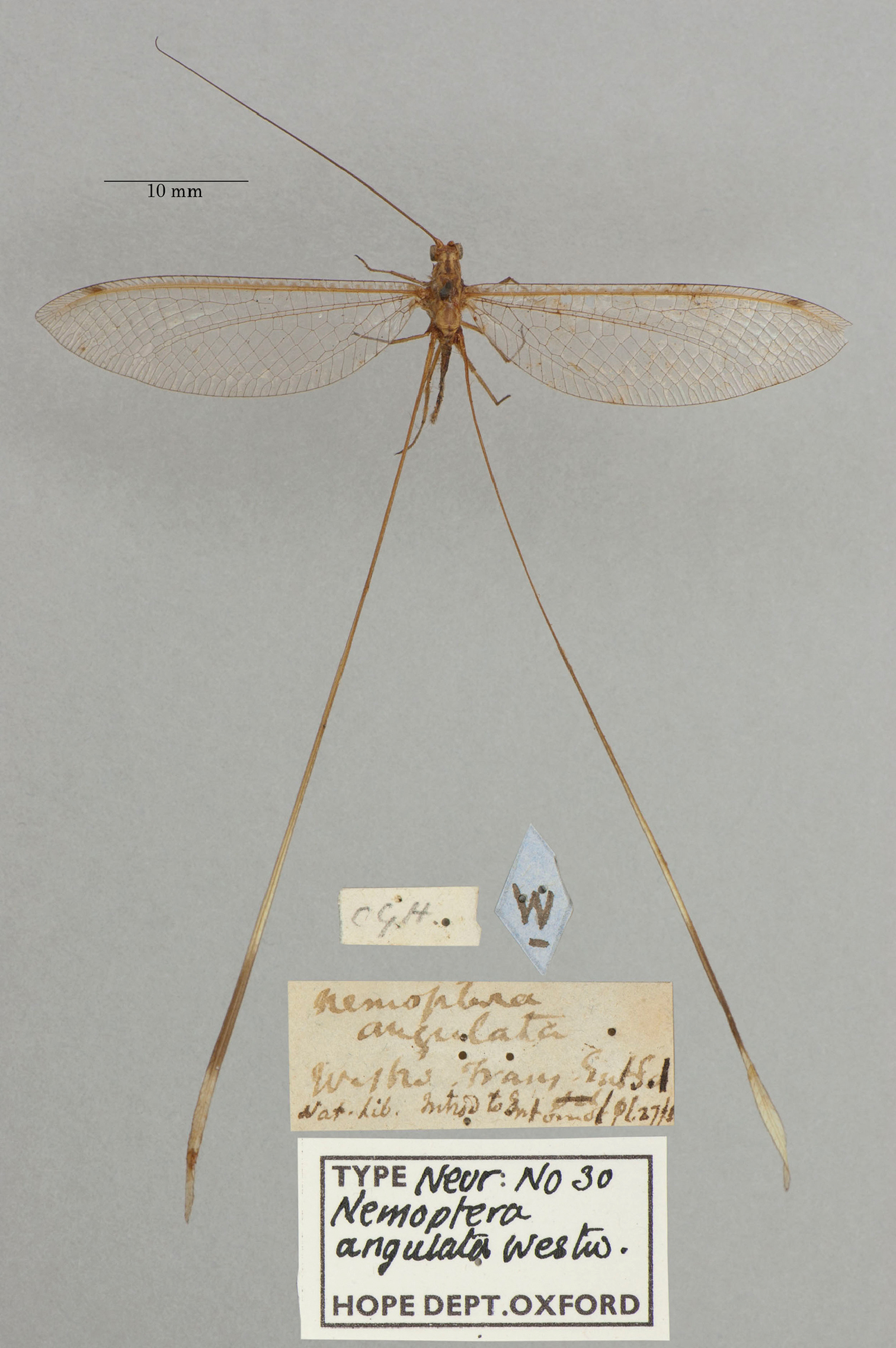
- Nemia angulata

Scientific classification
- Domain: Eukaryota
- Kingdom: Animalia
- Phylum: Arthropoda
- Class: Insecta
- Order: Neuroptera
- Family: Nemopteridae
- Genus: Nemia; Navás, 1915

= Nemia =

Genus of insects

Nemia is a genus of insects belonging to the family Nemopteridae.

The species of this genus are found in Southern Africa.

Species:

- Nemia angulata (Westwood, 1836)
- Nemia costalis (Westwood, 1836)
