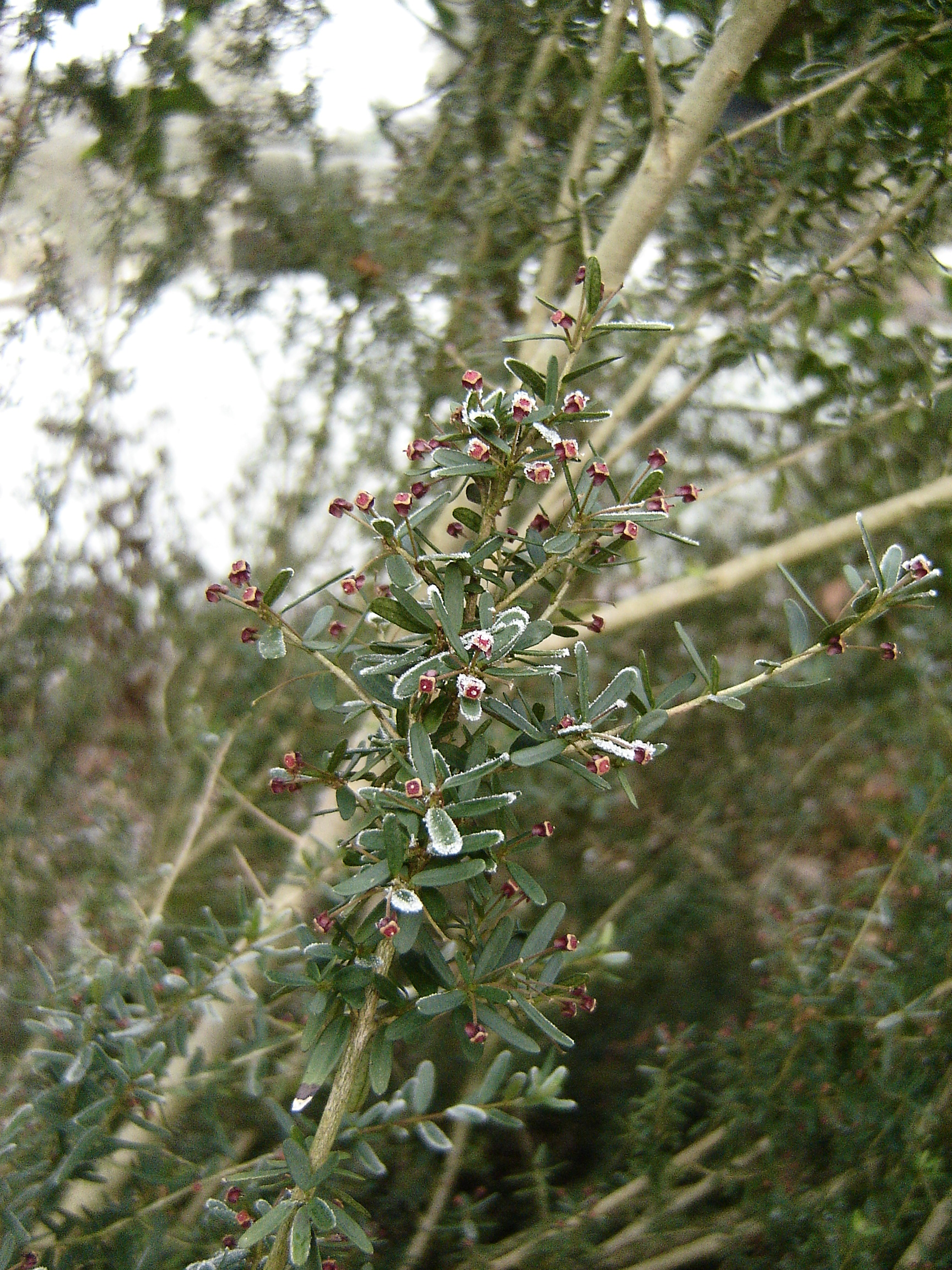

Scientific classification
- Kingdom: Plantae
- Clade: Tracheophytes
- Clade: Angiosperms
- Clade: Eudicots
- Clade: Rosids
- Order: Myrtales
- Family: Myrtaceae
- Genus: Myrceugenia
- Species: M. leptospermoides

Binomial name
- Myrceugenia leptospermoides (DC) Kausel.

= Myrceugenia leptospermoides =

Species of plant

Myrceugenia leptospermoides is a species of small evergreen tree or large shrub in the genus Myrceugenia of the family Myrtaceae. It is commonly known as mocollo, murtilla del malo or chequen. It is endemic to central Chile where it is found in riverine habitats in the coastal mountain range at altitudes below 300 metres (980 ft).

== Description ==
Myrceugenia leptospermoides grows to a height of about 3 m (10 ft). The bark is pale greyish-brown and the small leaves are in opposite pairs. The twigs are densely pubescent when they first grow but soon lose their hairs. The leaves are up to 15 mm (1 in) long and 3 mm (0.1 in) broad, oblong or linear with bluntly-pointed tips, and with entire margins. They are greyish-green above and yellowish-green below, with a fairly prominent midrib on the underside. The flowers, which grow in the axils of the leaves, are solitary and have short stems. The calyx lobes are sometimes hairy and the six petals are white. In the centre of the flower there is a boss of sixty to ninety stamens and a single style. The fruit is a globular berry, ripening to red and finally purple, and about 5 mm (0.2 in) in diameter. The flowering period is February to March and the fruits ripen in July and August.

== Distribution and habitat ==
Myrceugenia leptospermoides is endemic to the coastal area of Chile. It is found from Ñuble Region southwards to Cautín Province. Its typical habitat is in wet or misty locations and it is often found growing with other undergrowth shrubs, near rivers and lakes or on damp forested slopes. It occurs at altitudes up to about 300 metres (980 ft). It is an uncommon species and its conservation status is considered to be "endangered".
