= Myrceugenia franciscensis =

Conservation status
- Vulnerable (IUCN 3.1)

Scientific classification
- Kingdom: Plantae
- Clade: Tracheophytes
- Clade: Angiosperms
- Clade: Eudicots
- Clade: Rosids
- Order: Myrtales
- Family: Myrtaceae
- Genus: Myrceugenia
- Species: M. franciscensis

Binomial name
- Myrceugenia franciscensis (O.Berg) Landrum

Synonyms
- Eugenia franciscensis O.Berg; Luma franciscensis (O.Berg) Burret; Luma mucronata Burret; Myrceugenia bracteosa var. franciscensis (O.Berg) D.Legrand; Myrceugenia longipedunculata Mattos & D.Legrand; Myrceugenia mucronata (Burret) D.Legrand & Kausel

Species of flowering plant

Myrceugenia franciscensis is a species of flowering plant in the family Myrtaceae. It is a shrub endemic to southern and southeastern Brazil (São Paulo to Paraná states).
