= Myrceugenia rufescens =

Conservation status
- Least Concern (IUCN 3.1)

Scientific classification
- Kingdom: Plantae
- Clade: Tracheophytes
- Clade: Angiosperms
- Clade: Eudicots
- Clade: Rosids
- Order: Myrtales
- Family: Myrtaceae
- Genus: Myrceugenia
- Species: M. rufescens

Binomial name
- Myrceugenia rufescens (DC.) D.Legrand & Kausel

Synonyms
- Eugenia planiramea O.Berg; Eugenia poeppigiana O.Berg; Eugenia rufescens DC.; Luma planiramea (O.Berg) Burret; Luma poeppigiana (O.Berg) Burret; Luma rufescens (DC.) Burret; Myrceugenia jonssonii Kausel; Myrceugenia rufescens var. alegrensis D.Legrand; Myrtus rufescens (DC.) Spreng.; Myrtus ugni var. poeppigii Kuntze

Species of flowering plant

Myrceugenia rufescens is a species of flowering plant in the family Myrtaceae. It is a shrub or tree endemic to southern and southeastern Brazil.
