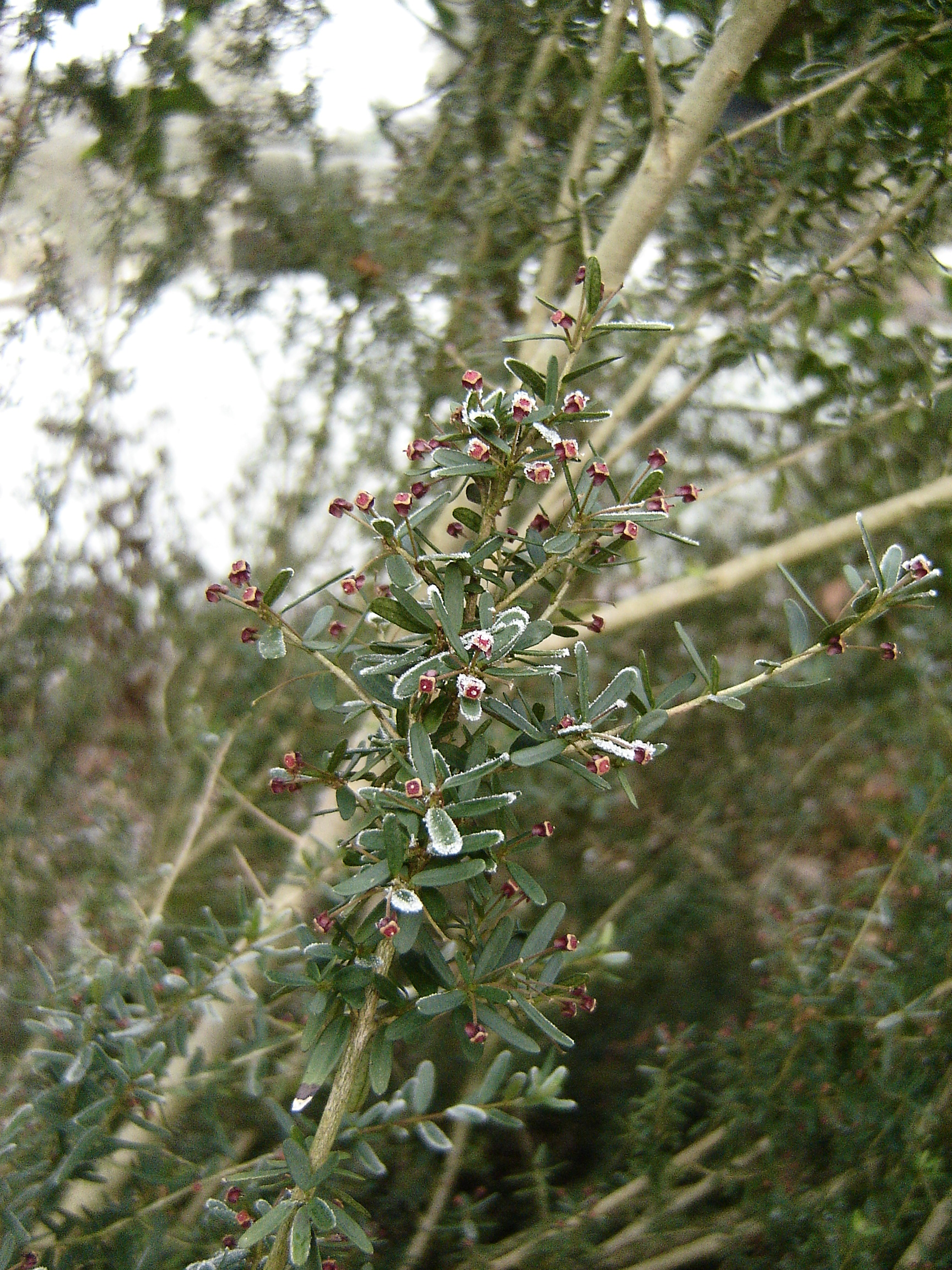
- Myrceugenia leptospermoides

Scientific classification
- Kingdom: Plantae
- Clade: Embryophytes
- Clade: Tracheophytes
- Clade: Angiosperms
- Clade: Eudicots
- Clade: Rosids
- Order: Myrtales
- Family: Myrtaceae
- Subfamily: Myrtoideae
- Tribe: Myrteae
- Genus: Myrceugenia; O.Berg

Type species
- Myrceugenia myrtoides O.Berg

= Myrceugenia =

Genus of flowering plants in the myrtle family

Myrceugenia is a genus of evergreen woody flowering trees and shrubs belonging to the myrtle family, Myrtaceae, first described as a genus in 1855. The genus is native to South America from central Brazil to southern Chile. It is closely related to the genus Luma; some botanists include Myrceugenia in that genus.

Myrceugenia schulzei is endemic to Alejandro Selkirk Island in the Juan Fernández Islands, located in the Pacific Ocean west of the Chilean coast. Nothomyrcia fernandeziana, which is endemic to nearby Robinson Crusoe Island, was formerly placed in Myrceugenia but is now considered the sole species of genus Northomyrcia. Both are prominent trees in the lowland and lower montane forests of the islands.

== Species ==
46 species are currently accepted.

- Myrceugenia acutiflora (Kiaersk.) D.Legrand & Kausel – S. Brazil
- Myrceugenia alpigena (DC.) Landrum – Brazil
- Myrceugenia bananalensis Bezerra & Landrum – Brasilia D.F.
- Myrceugenia basicordata F.C.S.Vieira, Molz & Sobral – Santa Catarina
- Myrceugenia bocaiuvensis Mattos – Paraná
- Myrceugenia bracteosa (DC.) D.Legrand & Kausel – S. Brazil
- Myrceugenia brevipedicellata (Burret) D.Legrand & Kausel – Minas Gerais, São Paulo
- Myrceugenia × bridgesii (Hook. & Arn.) O.Berg – central Chile
- Myrceugenia camargoana Mattos – Rio Grande do Sul
- Myrceugenia campestris (DC.) D.Legrand & Kausel – S. Brazil
- Myrceugenia chrysocarpa (O.Berg) Kausel – S. Chile, S. Argentina
- Myrceugenia colchaguensis (Phil.) L.E.Navas – C. Chile
- Myrceugenia correifolia (Hook. & Arn.) O.Berg – C. Chile
- Myrceugenia cucullata D.Legrand – S. Brazil
- Myrceugenia decussata Mattos – São Paulo
- Myrceugenia × diemii Kausel – C. Chile, S. Argentina
- Myrceugenia euosma (O.Berg) D.Legrand – S. Brazil, Paraguay, Uruguay, Misiones
- Myrceugenia exsucca (DC.) O.Berg – C. – S. Chile, S. Argentina
- Myrceugenia foveolata (O.Berg) Sobral – S. Brazil
- Myrceugenia franciscensis (O.Berg) Landrum – São Paulo, Paraná
- Myrceugenia gertii Landrum – S. Brazil
- Myrceugenia glaucescens (Cambess.) D.Legrand & Kausel – Brazil, Paraguay, Uruguay, NE Argentina
- Myrceugenia hamoniana (Mattos) Sobral – Santa Catarina
- Myrceugenia hatschbachii Landrum – Paraná
- Myrceugenia hoehnei (Burret) D.Legrand & Kausel – São Paulo, Santa Catarina
- Myrceugenia joinvillensis F.C.S.Vieira – Santa Catarina
- Myrceugenia kleinii D.Legrand & Kausel – São Paulo, Santa Catarina
- Myrceugenia lanceolata (Juss. ex J.St.-Hil.) Kausel – C. Chile
- Myrceugenia leptospermoides (DC.) Kausel – C. Chile
- Myrceugenia mesomischa (Burret) D.Legrand & Kausel – Rio Grande do Sul
- Myrceugenia miersiana (Gardner) D.Legrand & Kausel – S. + E. Brazil
- Myrceugenia myrcioides (Cambess.) O.Berg – S. + E. Brazil
- Myrceugenia myrtoides O.Berg – S. Brazil, Uruguay
- Myrceugenia obtusa (DC.) O.Berg – C. Chile
- Myrceugenia ovalifolia (O.Berg) Landrum – São Paulo, Paraná
- Myrceugenia ovata (Hook. & Arn.) O.Berg – S. + SE Brazil, S. Argentina, C. + S. Chile
- Myrceugenia oxysepala (Burret) D.Legrand & Kausel – S. Brazil
- Myrceugenia parvifolia (DC.) Kausel – central and southern Chile
- Myrceugenia pilotantha (Kiaersk.) Landrum – S. Brazil
- Myrceugenia pinifolia (Reiche) Kausel – C. Chile
- Myrceugenia planipes (Hook. & Arn.) O.Berg – S. Chile, Neuquén
- Myrceugenia reitzii D.Legrand & Kausel – S. Brazil
- Myrceugenia rufa (Colla) Skottsb. – C. Chile
- Myrceugenia rufescens (Colla) Skottsb. – S. Brazil
- Myrceugenia schulzei Johow – Alejandro Selkirk Island
- Myrceugenia scutellata C.D.Legrand – S. Brazil
- Myrceugenia seriatoramosa (Kiaersk.) D.Legrand & Kausel – SE Brazil
- Myrceugenia venosa D.Legrand – Santa Catarina
