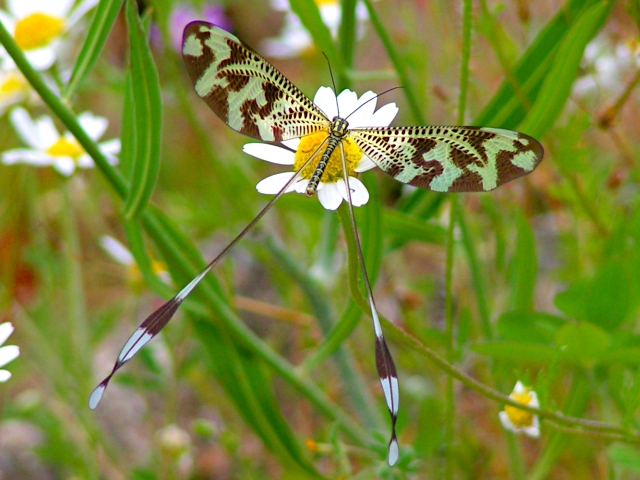
- Nemoptera bipennis

Scientific classification
- Kingdom: Animalia
- Phylum: Arthropoda
- Class: Insecta
- Order: Neuroptera
- Family: Nemopteridae
- Subfamily: Nemopterinae
- Genus: Nemoptera; Latreille, 1802

Species
- See text

= Nemoptera =

Genus of insects

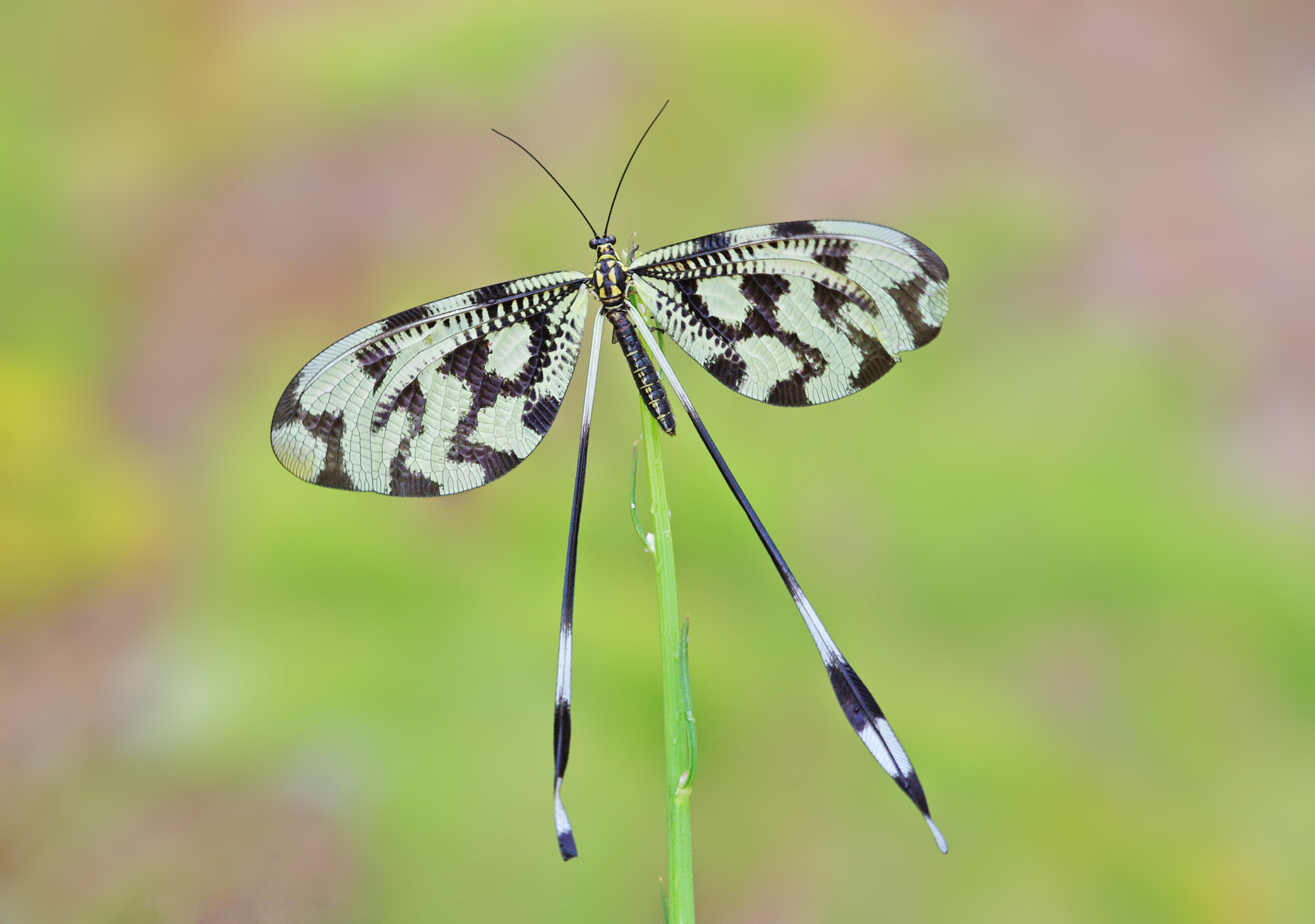
Nemoptera sinuata

Nemoptera is a Palearctic genus of insects of the spoonwing family, Nemopteridae. All species are diurnal with an exclusively floral diet, preferring to fly in open spaces in full sunshine while visiting flowers. They can be recognized by their very long hind wing prolongations.

== Taxonomy ==
The genus contains seven species, three of which are found in Europe.

- Nemoptera aegyptiaca Rambur, 1842
- Nemoptera alba Olivier, 1811
- Nemoptera bipennis (Illiger, 1812), syn. Nemoptera lusitanica (Leach, 1815)
- Nemoptera coa (Linnaeus, 1758)
- Nemoptera orientalis Olivier in Bonnaterre et al., 1828
- Nemoptera rachelii U. Aspöck et al., 2006
- Nemoptera sinuata Olivier, 1811

The African species Nemia karrooa was formerly placed in this genus.
