= Rebeca Acevedo =

Chilean botanist

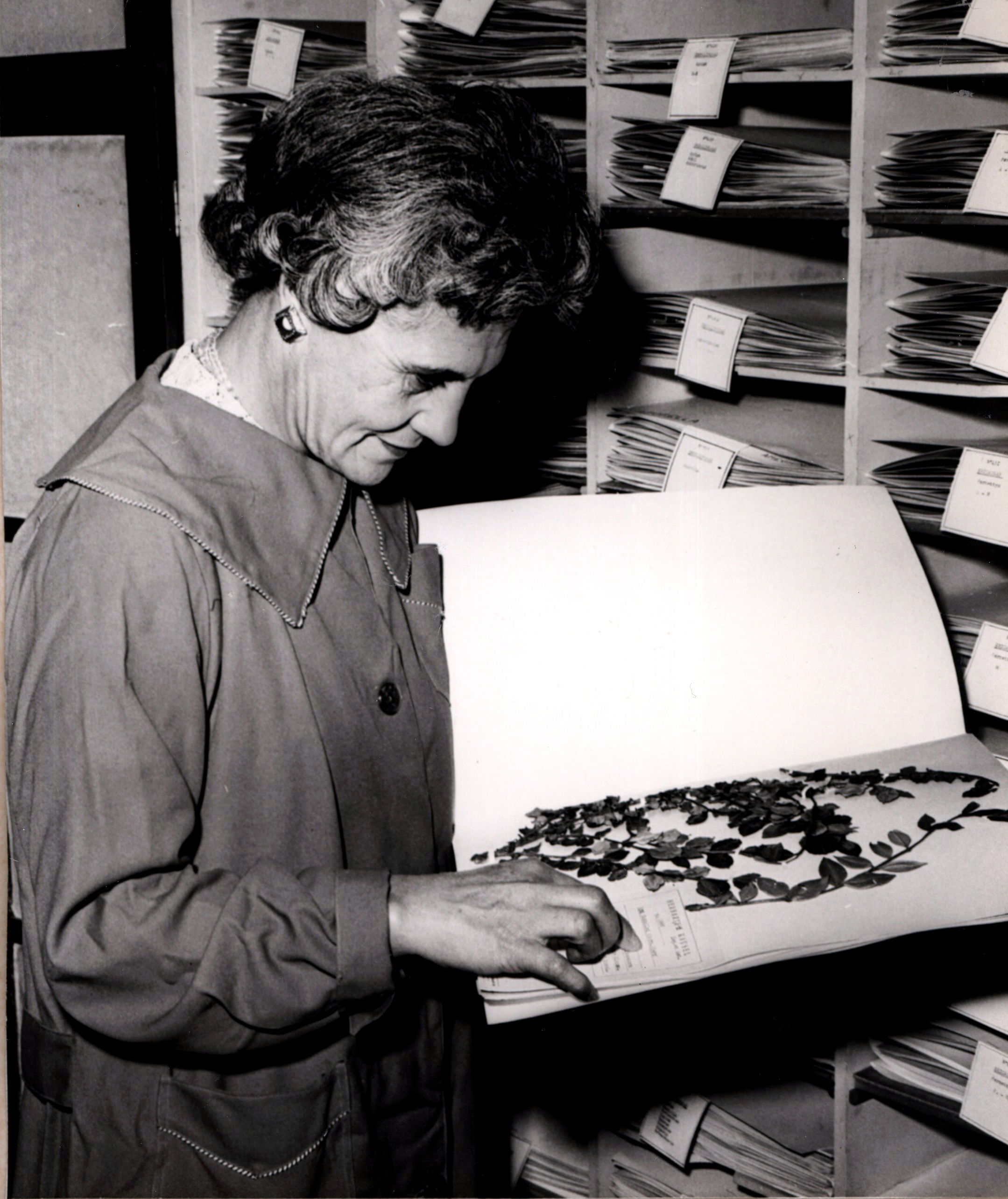
- Born: Rebeca Acevedo San Martín; 23 January 1902; Retiro, Linares Province, Chile
- Died: 7 December 1987 (aged 85); Santiago, Chile
- Education: University of Chile
- Scientific career
- Fields: Botany
- Workplaces: Chilean National Museum of Natural History
- Author abbrev. (botany): Acevedo

Rebeca Acevedo San Martín de Vargas (23 January 1902 – 7 December 1987) was a Chilean professor and botanist. In 1947, Acevedo became the first woman to head the botanical department of the Chilean National Museum of Natural History.

== Biography ==
Rebeca Acevedo San Martín was born on 23 January 1902 in Retiro, Linares Province.

She obtained bachelor's degrees in biology and chemistry from the University of Chile in 1924. While at college, she also studied at the Chilean National Museum of Natural History, where she made contact with renowned Chilean scientists such as Carlos E. Porter. She continued working in the museum as an assistant to Francisco Fuentes Maturana, who was the head of the botanical department. Acevedo began to specialize in grasses, and continued working as a curator. She was put in charge of organizing the herbarium started by Carlos Muñoz Pizarro.

In 1947, she became the head of the Museum's botanical department, becoming the first woman to hold that position. She held this position until 1964. As curator of the National Herbarium, she established relationships with various researchers and botanical specialists around the world, such as Carl Skottsberg, Olga Borsini, Otto Solbrig, and Maevia Correa.

== Legacy ==
Species named after Acevedo include Escallonia rebecae by Eberhard Max Leopold Kausel, and Placseptalia rebecae by Marcial Espinosa Bustos.
