= Council of the College of Pharmacists of Chile =

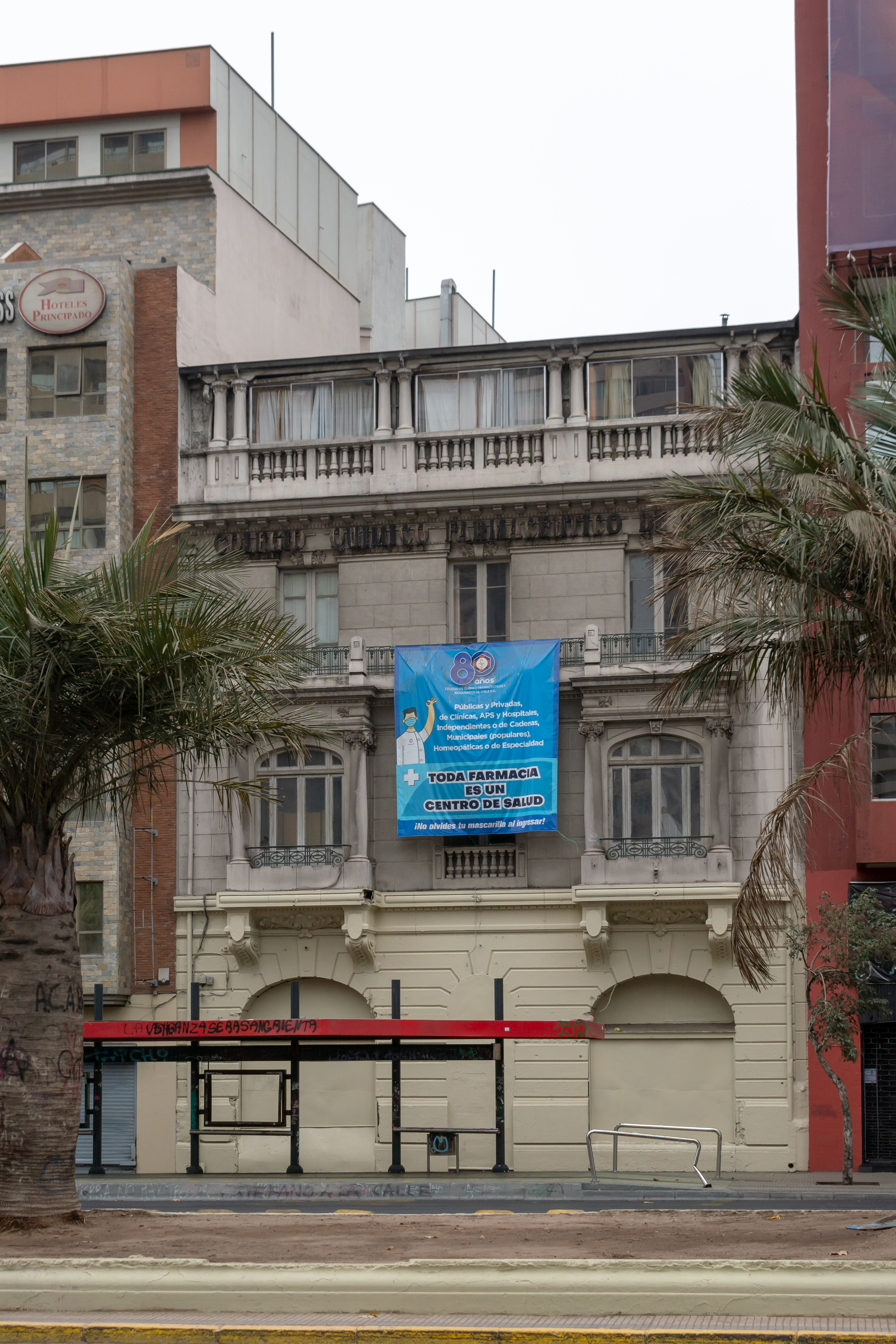
Used in the Spanish article

Council of the College of Pharmacists of Chile The Colegio Químico-Farmacéutico A. G., abbreviated as Colegio Químico Farmacéutico, is an association of pharmacists, and chemical pharmacists in Chile. I

Colegio Químico was founded in 1942 by law number 7205 as "Colegio de Farmacéuticos de Chile". After modification of the national Constitution it became an Association of private right on May 12, 1981 (Diario Oficial Nº 30962). It membership is over 1500 professionals.

Colegio Químico is an associate member of the International Pharmaceutical Federation (FIP).

== Founder members ==
The following pharmacists were founder members:

- Luis Vivanco Castro (representing Iquique),
- Juan González Matthews (Antofagasta),
- Gustavo Olivares Faúndez (La Serena),
- Ernesto Ewertz Voigt y Antonio Pavisic Nigoevic (both for Valparaíso),
- Orlando Cattani Marchetti,
- Alejandro Montero Quintana y Darío Avendaño Damon (Santiago),
- César Leyton Garavagno (Talca),
- Orlando Villablanca Venegas (Chillán),
- Otto Reszcznski Ramírez (Concepción),
- Carlos Madariaga Martínez (Angol),
- Victor M. Cereceda Arancibia (Temuco),
- Ramiro Andrade Romero (Valdivia) and Francisco Ghiglino Noli (Magallanes).
