= Luisa Eugenia Navas =

Chilean botanist

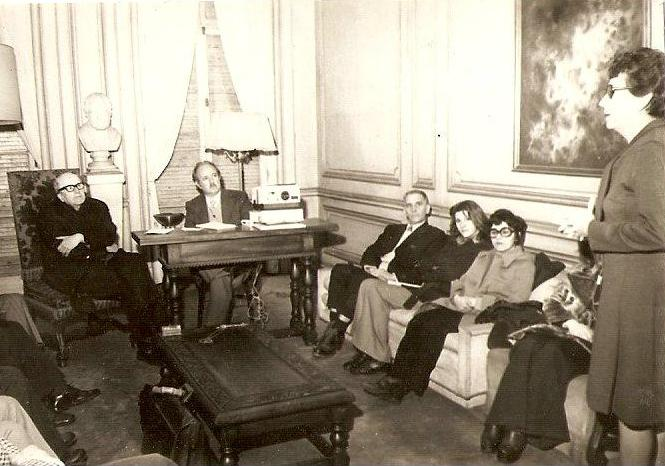
- Navas (far right) giving a speech to Hugo Gunckel Lüer
- Born: 27 July 1920; Chillán, Chile
- Died: 18 November 2020 (aged 100); Santiago, Chile
- Scientific career
- Fields: Botany
- Workplaces: University of Chile
- Author abbrev. (botany): L.E.Navas

Luisa Eugenia Navas Bustamante (27 July 1920 – 18 November 2020) was a Chilean pharmacist and botanist.

== Life ==
On 9 May 1951 she received a degree in chemistry and pharmacy. That same year she became Assistant Chair of Botany in the School of Chemistry and Pharmacy of the University of Chile. In 1958 she was “Professor extraordinarius”, and assistant of Hugo Gunckel in the Instituto Pedagógico in the section of the cryptogamic plants and finally chair Professor in the Faculty Chemical and Pharmaceutical Sciences the 1985. She studied seaweed, she concurred with his father to the Marine Biology Station at Montemar. With authorization of the Dean of Pharmacy, she went twice a week National Museum of Natural History of Santiago. On behalf of Humberto Fuenzalida, she reorganized the Botanical section for Cryptogamy. With a scholarship of UNESCO she studied plant ecology in Mexico, in the Polytechnical School with specialists of Montpellier and of the San Luis of Potosí. Later she concurs to the botanical Garden of the Central University of Caracas.

== Taxa described by L.E.Navas ==
- Gavilea longibracteata (Lindl.) Sparre ex L.E.Navas
- Dioscorea humifusa var.gracilis (H. et A.) L.E.Navas
- Myrceugenia colchaguensis (Phil.) L.E.Navas
- Parietaria fernandeziana (Steud.) L.E.Navas
- Urtica trichantha (Wedd.) Acevedo et L.E.Navas
