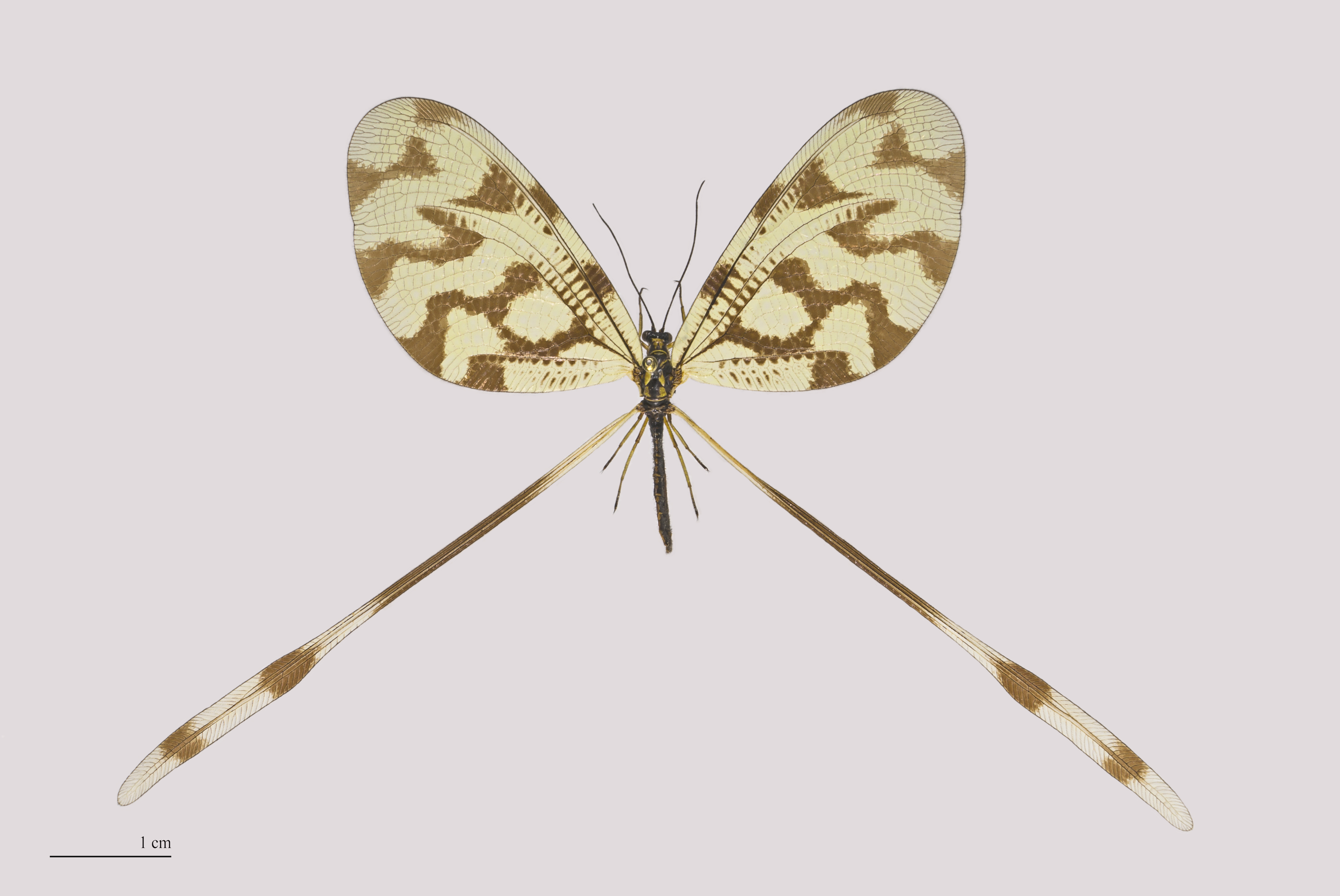
- Nemoptera sp. - Muséum of Toulouse

Scientific classification
- Kingdom: Animalia
- Phylum: Arthropoda
- Clade: Pancrustacea
- Class: Insecta
- Order: Neuroptera
- Superfamily: Myrmeleontoidea
- Family: Nemopteridae; Burmeister 1839

Subfamilies
- Crocinae; Nemopterinae

= Nemopteridae =

Nemopteridae Temporal range: Aptian–Present

Family of insects

Nemopteridae, the spoonwings, are a family of neuropteran insects. They are also called thread-winged antlions. They are found in the Ethiopian, Palearctic, Australasian and Neotropical realms but absent in North America (though a fossil has been found in Colorado).

Their flight is delicate and they have a circling flight to avoid walls when they are trapped indoors. The long streamer is conspicuous when the insects are flying and these are the elongated and spatulate hindwings.

The larvae are predators feeding on small insects including ants. The adults feed on nectar and pollen. As an adaptation to their diet, the adults have elongated heads and weak mandibles. Their maxillae and labium are elongate, rod-like, and setaceous. The study of a member of the genus Nemoptera, Nemoptera sinuata, have shown that in addition to collecting pollen with their mouthparts, they also use the tarsi of the forelegs.

Male nemopterids have a bulla on the wing usually along the margin or wing base that is used to disperse pheromone.

== Taxonomy ==
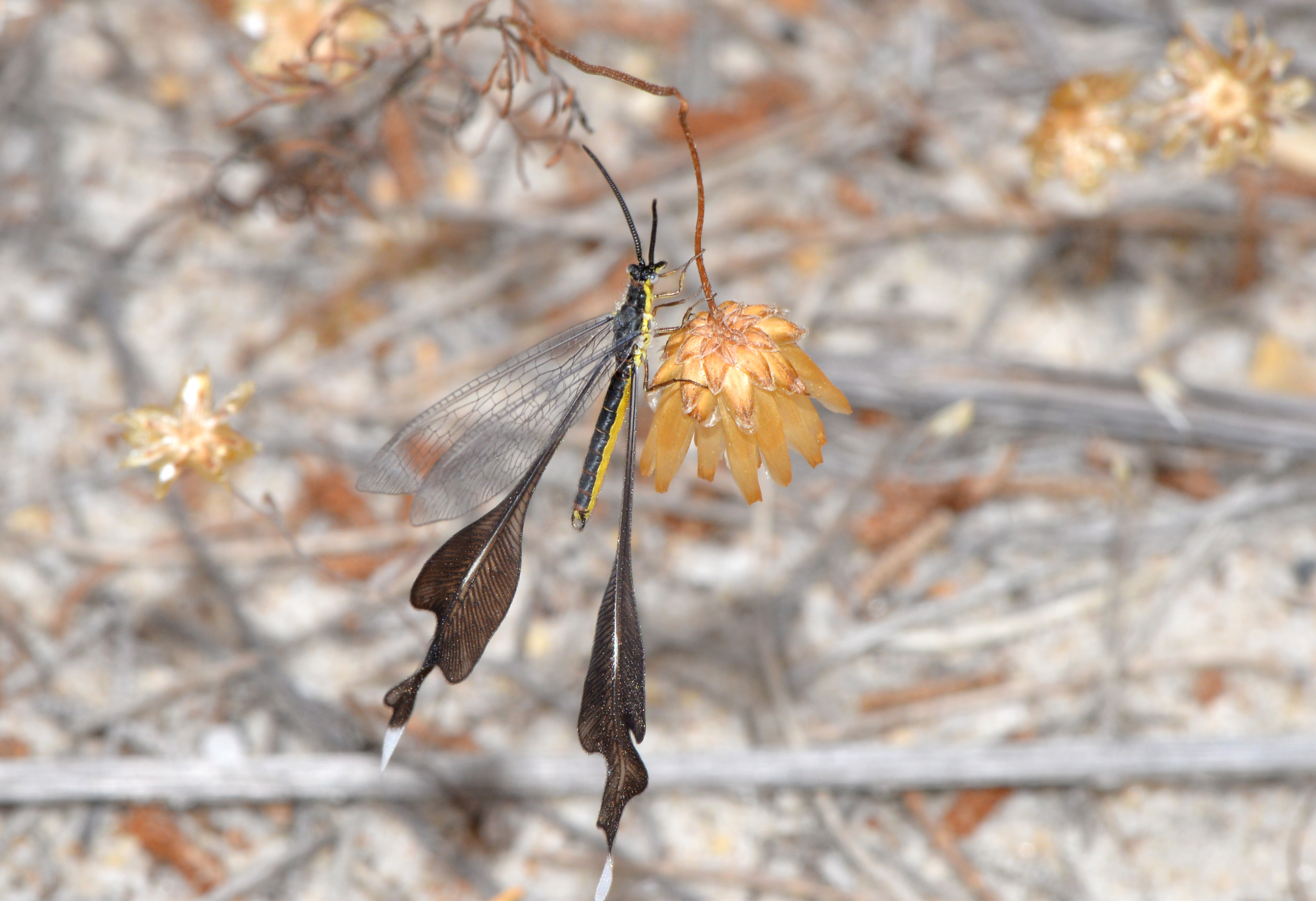
Chasmoptera hutti

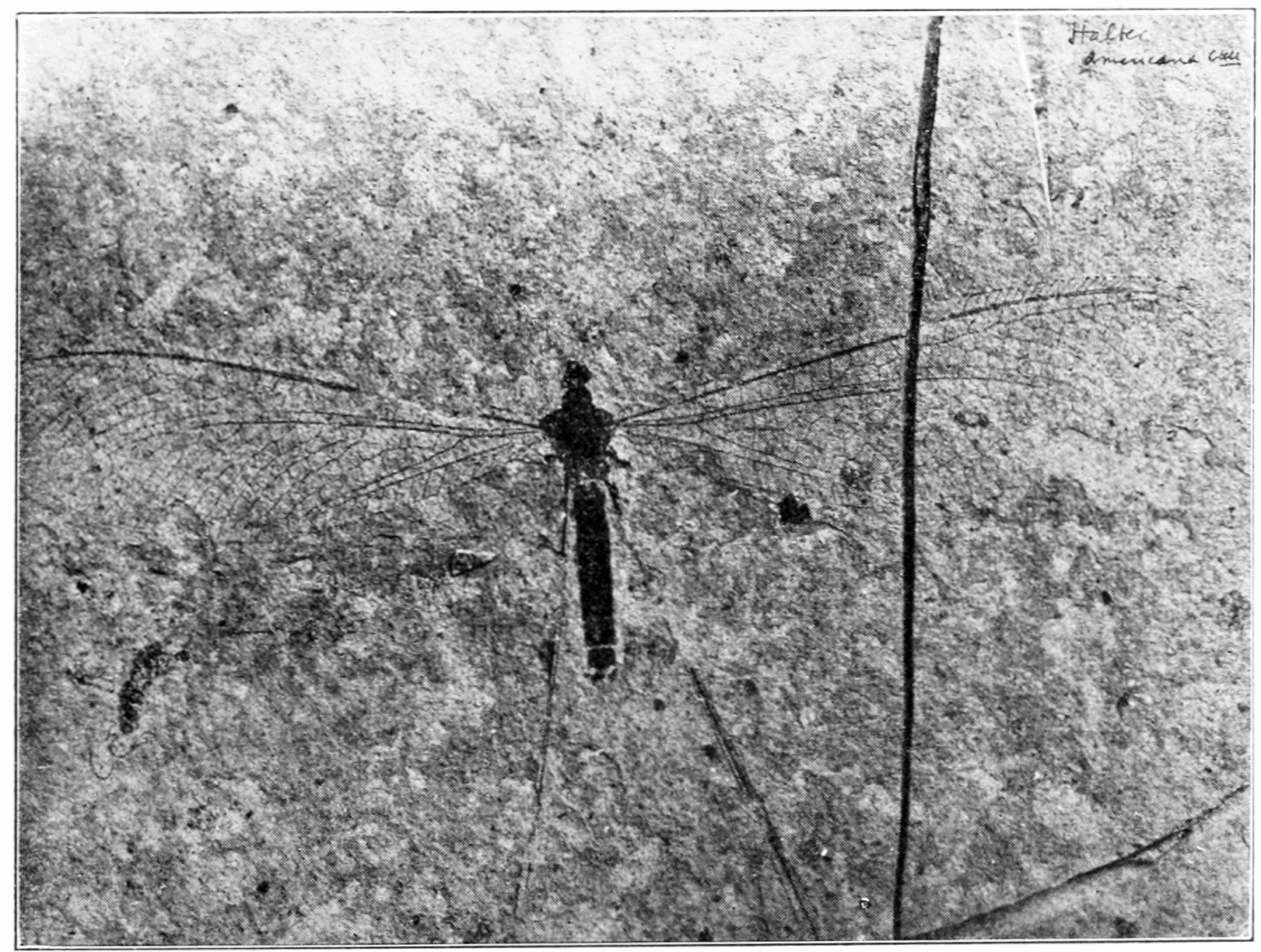
Marquettia americana Florissant Formation

There are two distinct subfamilies in the family Nemopteridae:

- Subfamily Crocinae, mostly nocturnal and crepuscular species with often a narrow habitat preference. They are found in arid desert zones and have a wide distribution along the southern fringes of the west Palearctic and Western Asia, as well as in dry Neotropical, Afrotropical, and Australian areas.

- Afghanocroce
- Amerocroce
- Anacroce
- Apocroce
- Austrocroce
- Carnarviana
- Concroce
- †Cretocroce Lu et al. 2019 – Cenomanian Burmese amber, Myanmar
- Croce
- Dielocroce
- Josandreva
- Laurhervasia
- Moranida
- Necrophylus
- Pterocroce
- Pastranaia
- Thysanocroce
- Tjederia
- Veurise

- Subfamily Nemopterinae – diurnal, with a greater diversity. Genera include:

- Barbibucca
- Lertha
- Nemoptera
- Nemopterella

Other nemopterid genera include:

- Brevistoma
- Chasmoptera
- †Cratonemopteryx Martins-Neto 1992 – Crato Formation, Brazil, Aptian
- Derhynchia
- Halter
- Halterina
- Knersvlaktia
- †Krika Martins-Neto 1992 – Crato Formation, Brazil, Aptian
- Lertha
- Nemeura
- Nemia
- Nemopistha
- Nemopterella
- Palmipenna
- Parasicyoptera
- Pterocroce
- †Roesleriana Martins-Neto 1997 – Crato Formation, Brazil, Aptian
- Savigniella
- Semirhynchia
- Sicyoptera
- Stenorrhachus
