= M. imbricata =

M. imbricata may refer to:

- Meladema imbricata, a beetle species endemic to Spain
- Micromyrtus imbricata, Benth., a shrub species in the genus Micromyrtus endemic to Australia

== See also ==
- Imbricata
