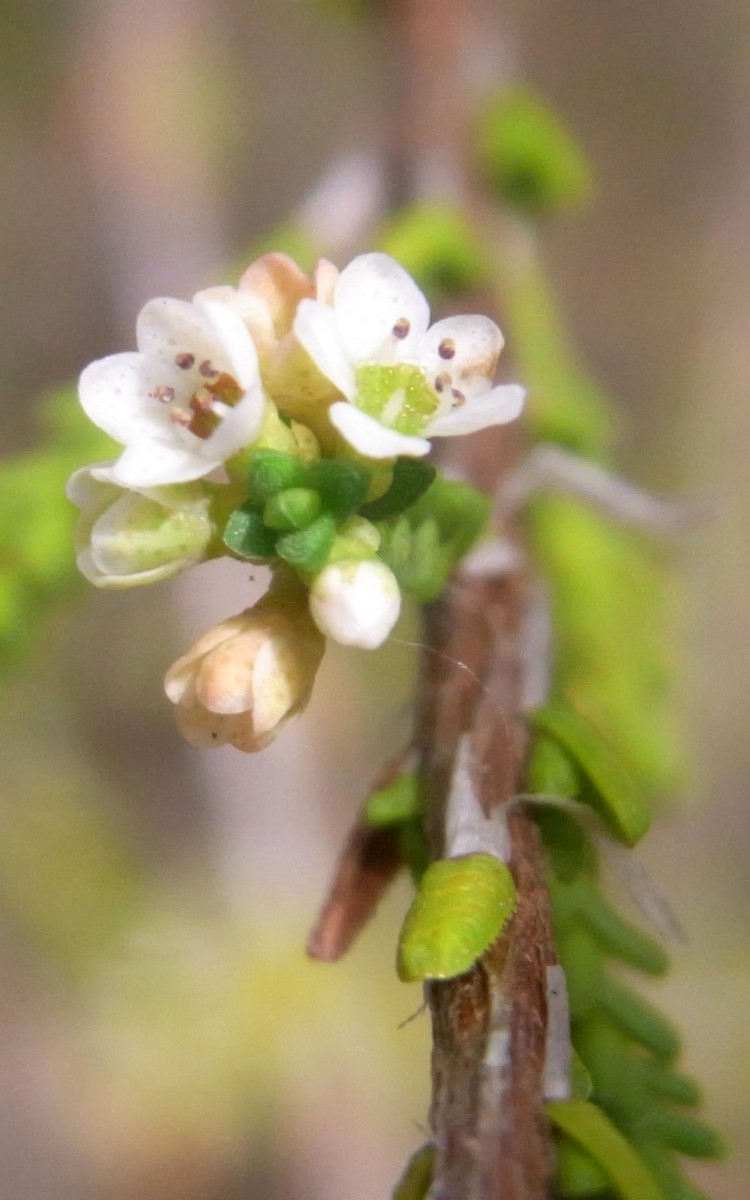
- Micromyrtus minutiflora

Conservation status
- Vulnerable (EPBC Act)

Scientific classification
- Kingdom: Plantae
- Clade: Tracheophytes
- Clade: Angiosperms
- Clade: Eudicots
- Clade: Rosids
- Order: Myrtales
- Family: Myrtaceae
- Genus: Micromyrtus
- Species: M. minutiflora

Binomial name
- Micromyrtus minutiflora Benth.

Synonyms
- Thryptomene minutiflora Woolls nom. inval., nom. nud.; Thryptomene plicata var. minutiflora Benth. nom. inval., pro syn.

= Micromyrtus minutiflora =

Species of shrub

Micromyrtus minutiflora is a species of flowering plant in the myrtle family and is endemic to New South Wales. It is a slender, spreading shrub with oblong to egg-shaped leaves and white flowers arranged singly in leaf axils.

== Description ==
Micromyrtus minutiflora is a slender, spreading shrub that typically grows to height of up to 2 m (6 ft 7 in) tall. The leaves are oblong to egg-shaped, 1–4 mm (0.039–0.157 in) long and 0.5–1.0 mm (0.020–0.039 in) wide with hairy edges. The flowers are arranged singly in leaf axils, sometimes in clusters at the ends of branches, on a peduncle up to 0.5 mm (0.020 in) long, with 2 bracteoles about 0.5 mm (0.020 in) long at the base. The sepals are membrane-like and about 0.5 mm (0.020 in) long and the petals white and about 1 mm (0.039 in) long. There are 5 stamens, the filaments up to 0.5 mm (0.020 in) long. Flowering occurs in spring and the fruit is a nut.

== Taxonomy and naming ==
Micromyrtus minutiflora was first formally described in 1867 by George Bentham in Flora Australiensis. The specific epithet (minutiflora) means "tiny-flowered".

== Distribution and habitat ==
This species grows in the western part of the Cumberland Plain where it grows on old alluvial soils. It is similar to M. ciliata that only grows on sandstone.

== Conservation status ==
This species of myrtle is listed as "vulnerable" under the Australian Government Environment Protection and Biodiversity Conservation Act 1999 and as "endangered" under the New South Wales Government Biodiversity Conservation Act 2016. Threats to its existence include urban expansion, habitat loss, weed invasion, human recreation and the dumping of rubbish.
