= Micromyrtus placoides =

Conservation status
- Priority Three — Poorly Known Taxa (DEC)

Scientific classification
- Kingdom: Plantae
- Clade: Tracheophytes
- Clade: Angiosperms
- Clade: Eudicots
- Clade: Rosids
- Order: Myrtales
- Family: Myrtaceae
- Genus: Micromyrtus
- Species: M. placoides

Binomial name
- Micromyrtus placoides Rye

Species of shrub

Micromyrtus placoides is a species of the flowering plant in the family Myrtaceae and is endemic to the inland areas of Western Australia. It is a shrub with glabrous, oblong to almost round leaves, white flowers 3.0–3.5 mm (0.12–0.14 in) in diameter, and 10 stamens in each flower.

== Description ==
Micromyrtus placoides is a shrub that typically grows to 0.5–2.3 m (1 ft 8 in – 7 ft 7 in) high and more than 1 m (3 ft 3 in) wide, with several stems or branches from its base. Its leaves are oblong to almost round, 1.3–2.2 mm (0.051–0.087 in) long and 0.8–1.3 mm (0.031–0.051 in) wide on a petiole about 0.3 mm (0.012 in) long. The flowers are 5.0–5.5 mm (0.20–0.22 in) in diameter, and arranged in between 4 and 7 upper leaf axils on a peduncle 0.4–0.8 mm (0.016–0.031 in) long. The sepals are egg-shaped, 0.5–0.6 mm (0.020–0.024 in) wide and green with deep reddish-brown to white edges. The petals are white, broadly egg-shaped with the narrower end towards the base and about 2 mm (0.079 in) long. There are 10 stamens in each flower with 5 almost half-way down the hypanthium, the anthers about 0.35 mm (0.014 in) long. Flowering occurs between July and September.

== Taxonomy ==
Micromyrtus placoides was first formally described in 2006 by Barbara Lynette Rye in the journal Nuytsia from specimens collected by Malcolm Eric Trudgen near Tallering Peak in 1978. The specific epithet (placoides) means "plate-like", referring to the hypanthium.

== Distribution and habitat ==
This species occurs in a similar habitat to M. acuta, possibly also on granite, and occurs near Tallatering Peak and near Cue in the Murchison and Yalgoo biogeographic regions of inland Western Australia.

== Conservation status ==
Micromyrtus placoides is listed as "Priority Three" by the Government of Western Australia Department of Parks and Wildlife meaning that it is poorly known and known from only a few locations but is not under imminent threat.
