= Micromyrtus albicans =

Scientific classification
- Kingdom: Plantae
- Clade: Tracheophytes
- Clade: Angiosperms
- Clade: Eudicots
- Clade: Rosids
- Order: Myrtales
- Family: Myrtaceae
- Genus: Micromyrtus
- Species: M. albicans

Binomial name
- Micromyrtus albicans A.R.Bean

Species of shrub

Micromyrtus albicans is a species of flowering plant in the myrtle family, Myrtaceae and is endemic to a small area of south-eastern Queensland. It is a slender shrub with overlapping, egg-shaped leaves and small white flowers.

== Description ==
Micromyrtus albicans is a slender erect shrub that typically grows up to 3 m (9.8 ft) high and 0.5 m (1 ft 8 in) wide and has pendulous branchlets. It leaves overlap each other, egg-shaped with the narrower end towards the base, 1.2–2.5 mm (0.047–0.098 in) long, 0.6–0.9 mm (0.024–0.035 in) wide and sessile with oil glands. The flowers are arranged singly in leaf axils on a peduncle 0.5–1 mm (0.020–0.039 in) long with bracteoles about 0.9 mm (0.035 in) long at the base. The sepal lobes are round or oblong, 0.4–0.8 mm (0.016–0.031 in) long and wide and the petals are white, egg-shaped or round and 1.1–1.4 mm (0.043–0.055 in) long. There are five stamens, each opposite a petal, the filaments about 0.3 mm (0.012 in) long. Flowering occurs throughout the year.

== Taxonomy ==
Micromyrtus albicans was first formally described in 1997 by Anthony Bean in the journal Austrobaileya from specimens collected near Chinchilla in 1994. The specific epithet (albicans`) means "white" or "becoming white", contrasting the flower colour of this species with the yellow flowers of M. carinata.

== Distribution and habitat ==
This species of micromyrtus grows in woodland and is only known from the north-eastern quarter of the Barakula State Forest near Chincilla in south-eastern Queensland.
