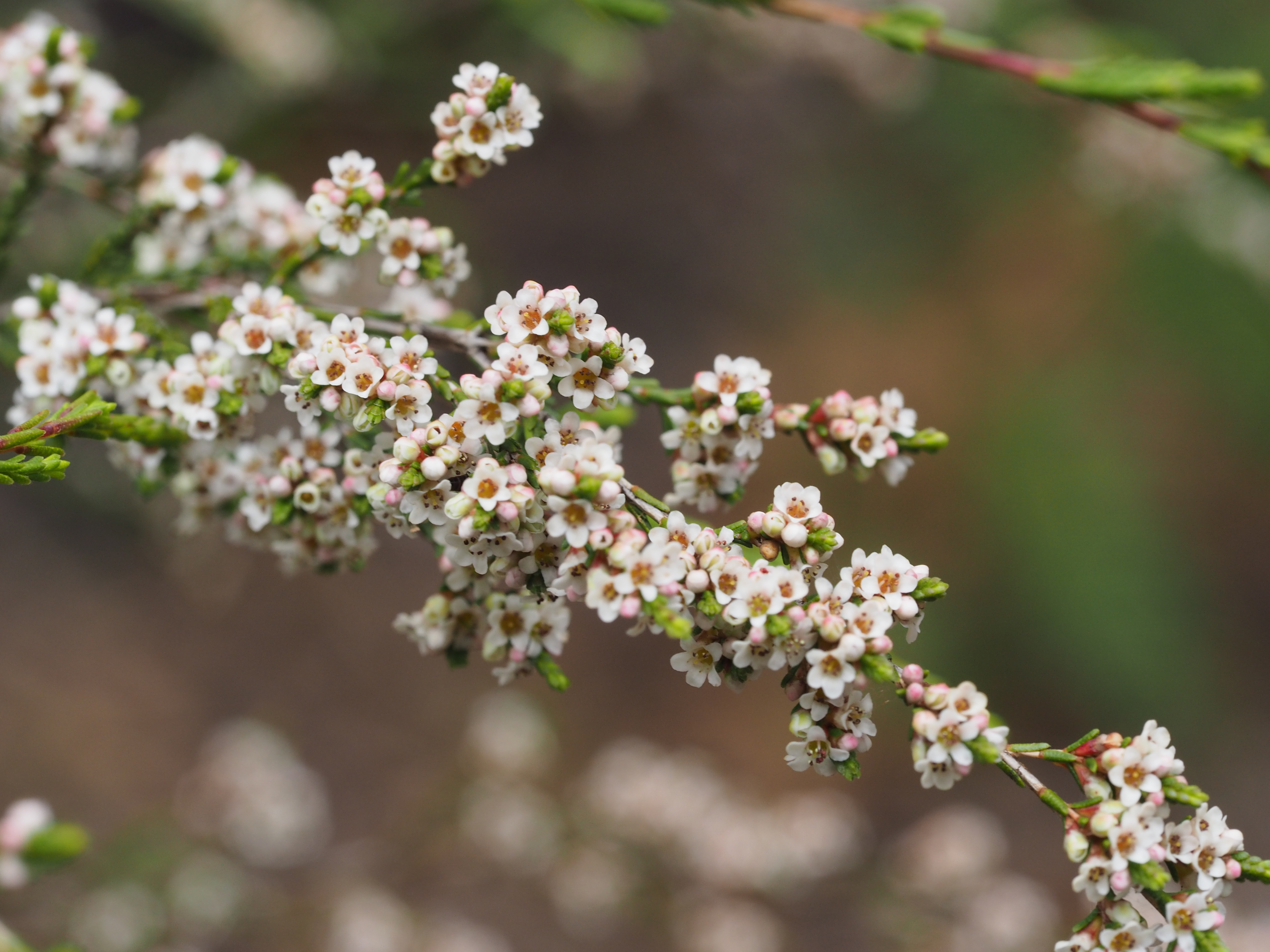
- In the Bolivia Hill Nature Reserve south of Tenterfield

Scientific classification
- Kingdom: Plantae
- Clade: Tracheophytes
- Clade: Angiosperms
- Clade: Eudicots
- Clade: Rosids
- Order: Myrtales
- Family: Myrtaceae
- Genus: Micromyrtus
- Species: M. sessilis

Binomial name
- Micromyrtus sessilis J.W.Green
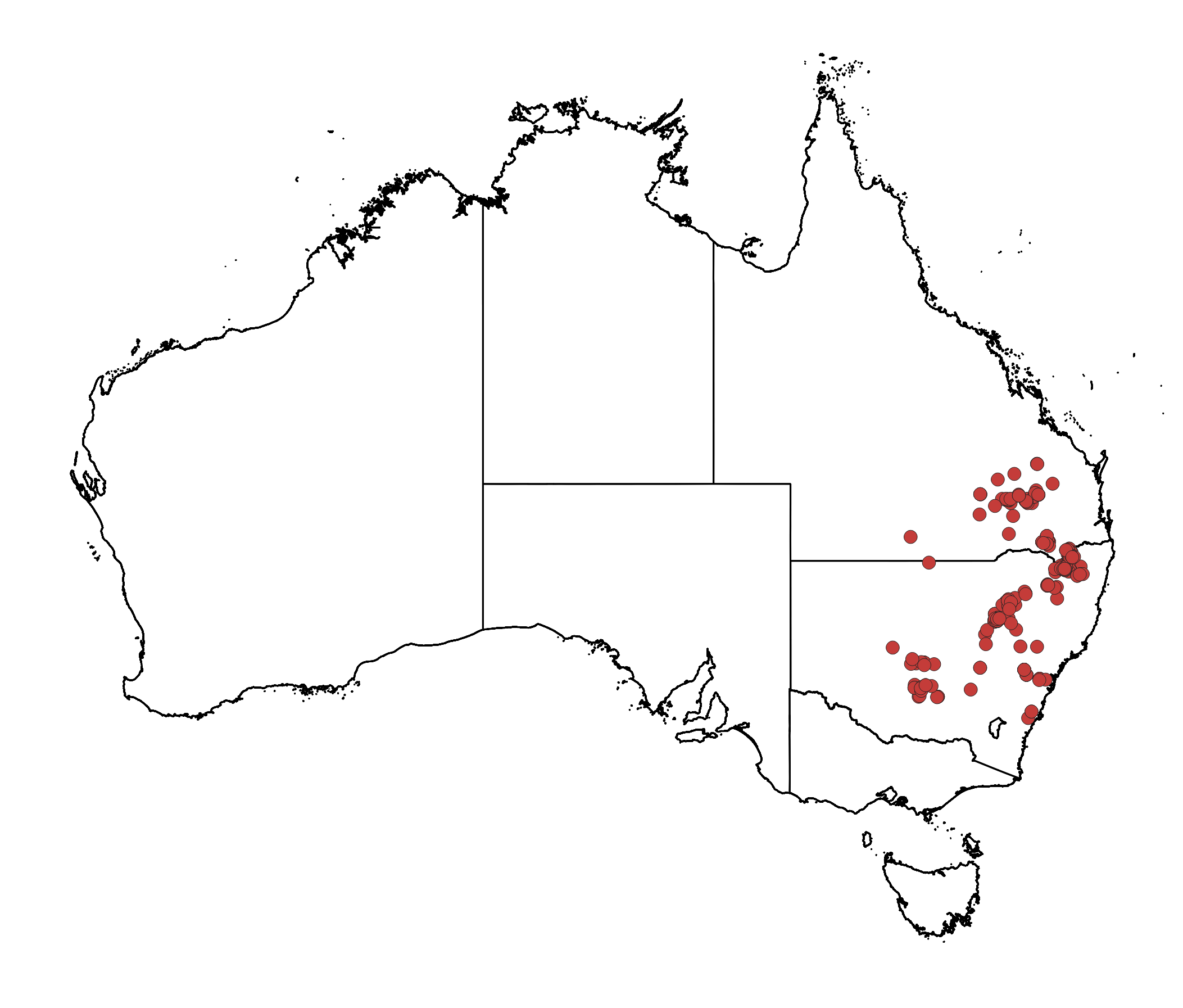
- Occurrence data from AVH

= Micromyrtus sessilis =

Species of shrub

Micromyrtus sessilis is a species of flowering plant in the myrtle family, Myrtaceae and is endemic to eastern Australia. It is a dense, spreading shrub with small, more or less linear leaves and flowers that are sometimes single in the upper leaf axils or in dense clusters along the branches. It is similar to M. ciliata but has a more northerly distribution.

== Description ==
Micromyrtus sessilis is a dense, spreading shrub growing to a height of 0.5–1.5 m (2–5 ft) and which has hairy young stems. The leaves are linear to lance-shaped with the narrower end towards the base, 1.5–3 mm (0.06–0.1 in) long and less than 1 mm (0.04 in) wide with a petiole about 1 mm (0.04 in) long. The flowers are sometimes arranged singly in upper leaf axils, sometimes form small heads and are sometimes arranged in dense clusters. There are two bracteoles at the base of each flower and which fall off as the flower opens. The floral cup is cone-shaped and has rounded ribs on its side. The sepals are less than 1 mm (0.04 in) long and the petals are white to pale pink, circular to elliptic in shape and 1–1.5 mm (0.04–0.06 in) long. There are five stamens 1–1.5 mm (0.04–0.06 in) long. Flowering mainly occurs in September and October.

== Taxonomy and naming ==
Micromyrtus sessilis was first formally described in 1983 by John Green from a specimen collected near Miles and the description was published in Nuytsia. The specific epithet (sessilis) is a Latin word meaning "sitting" referring to the flowers having a very short, or no peduncle.

== Distribution and habitat ==
This species occurs between Miles in Queensland and Griffith in New South Wales, mainly above 600 m (2,000 ft), in a range of habitats from mallee to forest, often in rocky places.
