= Micromyrtus forsteri =

Scientific classification
- Kingdom: Plantae
- Clade: Tracheophytes
- Clade: Angiosperms
- Clade: Eudicots
- Clade: Rosids
- Order: Myrtales
- Family: Myrtaceae
- Genus: Micromyrtus
- Species: M. forsteri

Binomial name
- Micromyrtus forsteri A.R.Bean

Species of shrub

Micromyrtus forsteri is a species of flowering plant in the myrtle family, Myrtaceae and is endemic to a small area of north Queensland. It is a shrub with overlapping, linear to egg-shaped leaves and small white flowers arranged singly in leaf axils with 10 stamens in each flower.

== Description ==
Micromyrtus forsteri is a shrub that typically grows up to 2.5 m (8 ft 2 in) high, and has grey bark. Its leaves overlap each other and are egg-shaped, 1.0–1.5 mm (0.039–0.059 in) long, 0.5–0.7 mm (0.020–0.028 in) wide and sessile. The leaves are glabrous and have many oil glands. The flowers are 4.0–4.5 mm (0.16–0.18 in) wide and arranged singly in leaf axils on a peduncle up to 0.5 mm (0.020 in) long, with 2 bracteoles about 0.8–1.0 mm (0.031–0.039 in) long at the base of the flower. There are 5 translucent or transparent sepals with lobes 0.5–0.7 mm (0.020–0.028 in) long and 5 more or less round, white to yellow petals 1.4–1.5 mm (0.055–0.059 in) long. There are 10 stamens, the filaments about 1 mm (0.039 in) long. Flowering has been observed in January, February and April.

== Taxonomy ==
Micromyrtus forsteri was first formally described in 1997 by Anthony Bean in the journal Austrobaileya from specimens collected near the Chillagoe to Wrotham Park road by Paul Irwin Forster in 1994. The specific epithet (forsteri) honours the collector of the type specimens.

== Distribution and habitat ==
This species of micromyrtus grows in open, rocky areas and is only known two locations in north Queensland near the type location.

== Conservation status ==
Micromytus forsteri is listed as "least concern" under the Queensland Government Nature Conservation Act 1992.
