= Micromyrtus mucronulata =

Conservation status
- Priority One — Poorly Known Taxa (DEC)

Scientific classification
- Kingdom: Plantae
- Clade: Tracheophytes
- Clade: Angiosperms
- Clade: Eudicots
- Clade: Rosids
- Order: Myrtales
- Family: Myrtaceae
- Genus: Micromyrtus
- Species: M. mucronulata

Binomial name
- Micromyrtus mucronulata Rye

Species of flowering plant

Micromyrtus mucronulata species of the family Myrtaceae and is endemic to the Western Australia. It is a shrub with linear to narrowly egg-shaped leaves with the narrower end toward the base, and white flowers 3.0–3.5 mm (0.12–0.14 in) in diameter.

== Description ==
Micromyrtus mucronulata is a shrub that typically grows to 0.5–1.5 m (1 ft 8 in – 4 ft 11 in) high and has erect leaves densely arranged on its smaller branchlets. Its leaves are linear to narrowly egg-shaped with the narrower end towards the base, 3.5–5.5 mm (0.14–0.22 in) long and 0.5–0.8 mm (0.020–0.031 in) wide on a petiole 0.4–0.5 mm (0.016–0.020 in) long. The flowers are 3.0–3.5 mm (0.12–0.14 in) in diameter, and arranged in between 6 and 17 upper leaf axils on a peduncle 1–2 mm (0.039–0.079 in) long. The sepals are egg-shaped, 0.2–0.5 mm (0.0079–0.0197 in) long and 0.6–0.8 mm (0.024–0.031 in) wide and the petals are white, broadly egg-shaped with the narrower end towards the base and 1.5–2.0 mm (0.059–0.079 in) long. The anthers are 0.25–0.35 mm (0.0098–0.0138 in) long and the style is 0.3–0.4 mm (0.012–0.016 in) wide. Flowering occurs between April and November and the fruit is 1.8–2.5 mm (0.071–0.098 in) long and about 0.8 mm (0.031 in) wide, containing a single seed.

== Taxonomy ==
Micromyrtus mucronulata was first formally described in 2010 by Barbara Lynette Rye in the journal Nuytsia from specimens collected in the Paynes Find by John Stanley Beard in 1973. The specific epithet (mucronulata) means "having a small, sharp point on the leaves".

== Distribution and habitat ==
This species grows on the summit or lower slopes of a hill in the Yalgoo bioregion of Western Australia.

== Conservation status ==
Micromyrtus mucronulata is listed as "Priority One" by the Government of Western Australia Department of Biodiversity, Conservation and Attractions, meaning that it is known from only one or a few locations which are potentially at risk.
