= Micromyrtus ninghanensis =

Conservation status
- Priority One — Poorly Known Taxa (DEC)

Scientific classification
- Kingdom: Plantae
- Clade: Tracheophytes
- Clade: Angiosperms
- Clade: Eudicots
- Clade: Rosids
- Order: Myrtales
- Family: Myrtaceae
- Genus: Micromyrtus
- Species: M. ninghanensis

Binomial name
- Micromyrtus ninghanensis Rye

Species of shrub

Micromyrtus ninghanensis is a species of the flowering plant in the family Myrtaceae and is endemic to the south-west of Western Australia. It is a low, spreading shrub with egg-shaped leaves with the narrower end toward the base, white flowers 3.0–3.5 mm (0.12–0.14 in) in diameter, and 10 stamens in each flower.

== Description ==
Micromyrtus ninghanensis is a low, spreading shrub that typically grows to 40 cm (16 in) high and has its leaves densely arranged near the ends of branchlets. Its leaves are erect, egg-shaped to broadly egg-shaped with the narrower end towards the base, 2.2–3.7 mm (0.087–0.146 in) long and 1.1–1.4 mm (0.043–0.055 in) wide on a petiole 0.4–0.5 mm (0.016–0.020 in) long. The flowers are 3.0–3.5 mm (0.12–0.14 in) in diameter, and arranged in between 2 and 15 upper leaf axils on a peduncle 0.7–0.8 mm (0.028–0.031 in) long. The sepals are egg-shaped, 0.2–0.35 mm (0.0079–0.0138 in) wide and pale brownish. The petals are white, very broadly egg-shaped with the narrower end towards the base and 1.3–1.6 mm (0.051–0.063 in) long. There are 10 stamens in each flower, the anthers 0.3–0.35 mm (0.012–0.014 in) long. Flowering occurs between September and late October, and the fruit is about 1.3 mm (0.051 in) long and 0.9–1.0 mm (0.035–0.039 in) wide, containing a single compressed seed.

== Taxonomy ==
Micromyrtus ninghanensis was first formally described in 2002 by Barbara Lynette Rye in the journal Nuytsia from specimens collected by Margaret Georgina Corrick in the Ninghan area, west-south-west of Paynes Find in 1984. The specific epithet (ninghanensis) refers to this species occurring in the Ninghan Station area.

== Distribution and habitat ==
This species is apparently restricted to the Ninghan area in the Yalgoo bioregion of south-western Western Australia where it grows on a greenstone-granite hill in low open woodland.

== Conservation status ==
Micromyrtus ninghanensis is listed as "Priority One" by the Government of Western Australia Department of Biodiversity, Conservation and Attractions, meaning that it is known from only one or a few locations which are potentially at risk.
