= Micromyrtus rogeri =

Conservation status
- Priority One — Poorly Known Taxa (DEC)

Scientific classification
- Kingdom: Plantae
- Clade: Tracheophytes
- Clade: Angiosperms
- Clade: Eudicots
- Clade: Rosids
- Order: Myrtales
- Family: Myrtaceae
- Genus: Micromyrtus
- Species: M. rogeri

Binomial name
- Micromyrtus rogeri Rye

Species of shrub

Micromyrtus rogeri is a species of flowering plant in the family Myrtaceae and is endemic to the south-west of Western Australia. It is shrub with egg-shaped leaves with the narrower end towards the base, and white flowers with 10 stamens.

== Description ==
Micromyrtus rogeri is a shrub that typically grows to a height of 20–40 cm (7.9–15.7 in) with many erect stems arising from a lignotuber. Its leaves are egg-shaped with the narrower end towards the base, 3.0–4.5 mm (0.12–0.18 in) long, 2.0–2.5 mm (0.079–0.098 in) wide on a petiole 0.5–0.6 mm (0.020–0.024 in) long with 8 to 10 prominent oil glands on the lower surface. The flowers are borne in racemes of 3 to 8 in leaf axils near the ends of branches on a peduncle 0.8–1.3 mm (0.031–0.051 in) long with egg-shaped, pale brown, toothed bracteoles about 2 mm (0.079 in) long. The flowers are about 3.5 mm (0.14 in) in diameter with sepals 0.4–0.5 mm (0.016–0.020 in) long. The petals are white, about 1.5 mm (0.059 in) long with 10 stamens in each flower. Flowering occurs from July to October.

== Taxonomy ==
Micromyrtus rogeri was first formally described in 2002 by Barbara Lynette Rye in the journal Nuytsia from specimens collected by Roger Hnatiuk about 30 km (19 mi) west-north-west of Arrino in 1980. The specific epithet (rogeri) honours Hnatiuk, the collector of the Type specimens.

== Distribution and habitat ==
This species of micromyrtus grows in sandy soils and gravel over laterite on breakaways near Arrino and Koojan in the Geraldton Sandplains and Jarrah Forest bioregions of south-western Western Australia.

== Conservation status ==
Micromyrtus rogeri is listed as "Priority One" by the Government of Western Australia Department of Biodiversity, Conservation and Attractions, meaning that it is known from only one or a few locations which are potentially at risk.
