= Micromyrtus collina =

Conservation status
- Priority One — Poorly Known Taxa (DEC)

Scientific classification
- Kingdom: Plantae
- Clade: Tracheophytes
- Clade: Angiosperms
- Clade: Eudicots
- Clade: Rosids
- Order: Myrtales
- Family: Myrtaceae
- Genus: Micromyrtus
- Species: M. collina

Binomial name
- Micromyrtus collina Rye

Species of shrub

Micromyrtus collina is a species of flowering plant in the myrtle family, Myrtaceae and is endemic to a small area in the southwest of Western Australia. It is an erect shrub with small, linear to narrowly egg-shaped leaves and small white flowers that turn pink as they age.

== Description ==
Micromyrtus collina is an erect shrub that typically grows to a height of 0.3–1.5 m (1 ft 0 in – 4 ft 11 in). Its leaves are directed upwards and densely crowded, linear to narrowly egg-shaped with the narrower end towards the base, 5.0–8.5 mm (0.20–0.33 in) long and 0.7–1.5 mm (0.028–0.059 in) wide on a petiole 0.7–0.9 mm (0.028–0.035 in) long, with 8 to 12 prominent oil glands. The flowers are 3.0–4.5 mm (0.12–0.18 in) in diameter, and arranged in 2 to 14 upper leaf axils on a peduncle 1.5–3 mm (0.059–0.118 in) long with narrowly egg-shaped or egg-shaped bracteoles 1.5–2.0 mm (0.059–0.079 in) long at the base. The sepals are egg-shaped, 0.4–0.6 mm (0.016–0.024 in) long and 0.5–0.7 mm (0.020–0.028 in) wide. The petals are white, turning pink as they age, broadly egg-shaped with the narrower end towards the base, and 1.5–2.2 mm (0.059–0.087 in) long. Flowering has been recorded from July to September.

== Taxonomy ==
Micromyrtus collina was first formally described in 2010 by Barbara Lynette Rye in the journal Nuytsia from specimens collected on the East Moresby Range in 1983. The specific epithet (collina) means "inhabiting low hills".

== Distribution and habitat ==
This species of micromyrtus grows in shrub vegetation on sandy soils over laterite in the Moresby Range in the Geraldton Sandplains bioregion of south-western Western Australia.

== Conservation status ==
Micromyrtus collina is classified as "Priority One" by the Government of Western Australia Department of Biodiversity, Conservation and Attractions, meaning that it is poorly known and from only one or a few locations.
