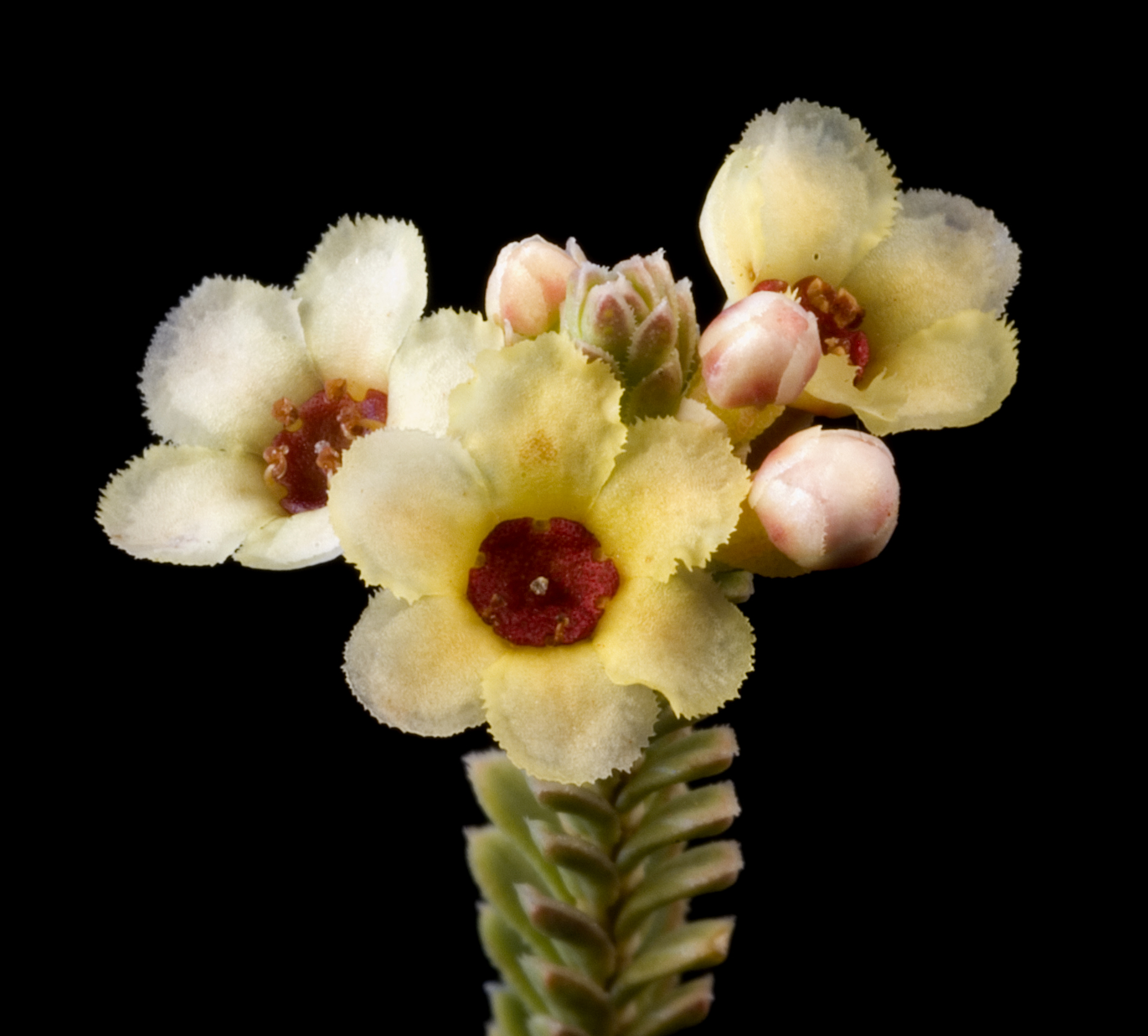

Scientific classification
- Kingdom: Plantae
- Clade: Tracheophytes
- Clade: Angiosperms
- Clade: Eudicots
- Clade: Rosids
- Order: Myrtales
- Family: Myrtaceae
- Genus: Micromyrtus
- Species: M. flaviflora

Binomial name
- Micromyrtus flaviflora (F.Muell.) J.M.Black

Synonyms
- Micromyrtus trachycalyx (F.Muell.) C.A.Gardner; Thryptomene flaviflora F.Muell. nom. inval., nom. nud.; Thryptomene flaviflora F.Muell.; Thryptomene trachycalyx F.Muell.

= Micromyrtus flaviflora =

Species of shrub

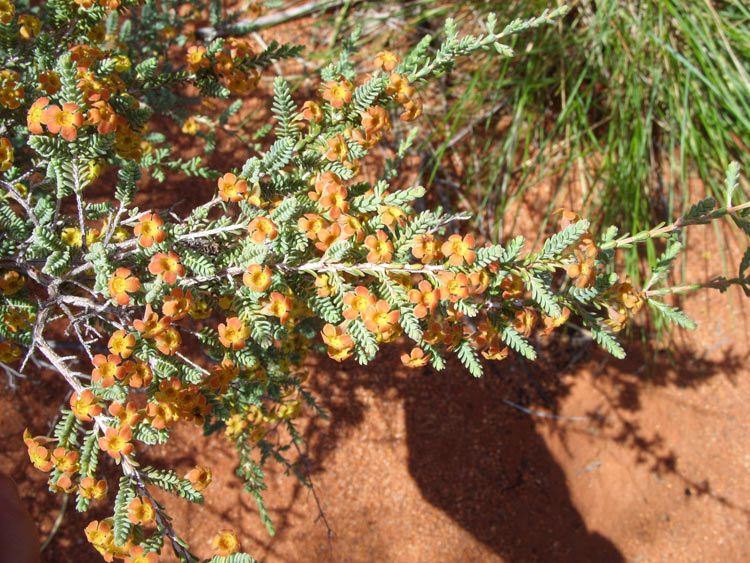
Habit near Uluru

Micromyrtus flaviflora is a species of flowering plant in the myrtle family, Myrtaceae and is endemic to inland areas of Australia. It is an erect shrub with overlapping, keeled, oblong leaves, and yellow flowers arranged singly in leaf axils, but often appearing clustered.

== Description ==
Micromyrtus flaviflora is an erect, loose or spreading shrub that typically grows to a height of 0.3–1.5 m (1 ft 0 in – 4 ft 11 in) and has reddish-brown, papery bark. Its leaves are oblong, 1–2 mm (0.039–0.079 in) long and 0.5–1 mm (0.020–0.039 in) wide and keeled. The flowers are arranged singly in leaf axils on a peduncle 1.5–2.5 mm (0.059–0.098 in) long but often appear clustered on side-branches. There are bracteoles 1.5–2.8 mm (0.059–0.110 in) long at the base but fall off as the flowers open. The sepals are about 0.9 mm (0.035 in) long and 1–2 mm (0.039–0.079 in) wide and the petals are yellow, more or less round and about 2 mm (0.079 in) in diameter. There are 5 stamens, the filaments about 0.8 mm (0.031 in) long. Flowering occurs in January or from April to November.

== Taxonomy ==
This species was first formally described in 1873 by Ferdinand von Mueller who gave it the name Thriptomene flaviflora in his Fragmenta Phytographiae Australiae from specimens collected by Ernest Giles in the MacDonnell Ranges. In 1926, John McConnell Black transferred the species to the genus Micromyrtus as M. flaviflora. The specific epithet (flaviflora) means "yellow-flowered".

== Distribution and habitat ==
Micromyrtus flaviflora is widespread and common in desert, growing on red, sandy dunes and plains mainly in inland Western Australia, but also in adjacent areas of the Northern Territory and South Australia.
