= Micromyrtus gracilis =

Scientific classification
- Kingdom: Plantae
- Clade: Tracheophytes
- Clade: Angiosperms
- Clade: Eudicots
- Clade: Rosids
- Order: Myrtales
- Family: Myrtaceae
- Genus: Micromyrtus
- Species: M. gracilis

Binomial name
- Micromyrtus gracilis A.R.Bean

Species of shrub

Micromyrtus gracilis is a species of flowering plant in the myrtle family, Myrtaceae and is endemic to central Queensland. It is a slender shrub with overlapping, egg-shaped leaves and white flowers arranged singly in leaf axils with 5 stamens in each flower.

== Description ==
Micromyrtus gracilis is a slender shrub that typically grows up to 3 m (9.8 ft) high and 0.5 m (1 ft 8 in) wide and has drooping branchlets. Its leaves overlap each other and are egg-shaped, sometimes with the narrower end towards the base, 1.1–1.7 mm (0.043–0.067 in) long, 0.6–1 mm (0.024–0.039 in) wide and sessile or on a petiole up to 0.6 mm (0.024 in) long. The leaves are glabrous and have many oil glands. The flowers are 2.2–2.9 mm (0.087–0.114 in) wide and arranged singly in leaf axils on a peduncle 0.5–1.1 mm (0.020–0.043 in) long, with 2 bracteoles about 0.6 mm (0.024 in) long but that fall off as the flowers develop. There are no sepals, but 5 elliptical or more or less round white petals 1.1–1.3 mm (0.043–0.051 in) long and 1.0–1.5 mm (0.039–0.059 in) wide. There are 5 stamens, the filaments 0.4–0.5 mm (0.016–0.020 in) long. Flowering occurs at any time of year, probably in response to rainfall.

== Taxonomy ==
Micromyrtus gracilis was first formally described in 1997 by Anthony Bean in the journal Austrobaileya from specimens collected near Westmar by Leslie Pedley in 1994. The specific epithet (gracilis) means "slender", referring to the habit of this species.

== Distribution and habitat ==
This species of micromyrtus grows in flat sites in shrubland, between Charters Towers and Westmar in central Queensland.

== Conservation status ==
Micromytus gracilis is listed as "least concern" under the Queensland Government Nature Conservation Act 1992.
