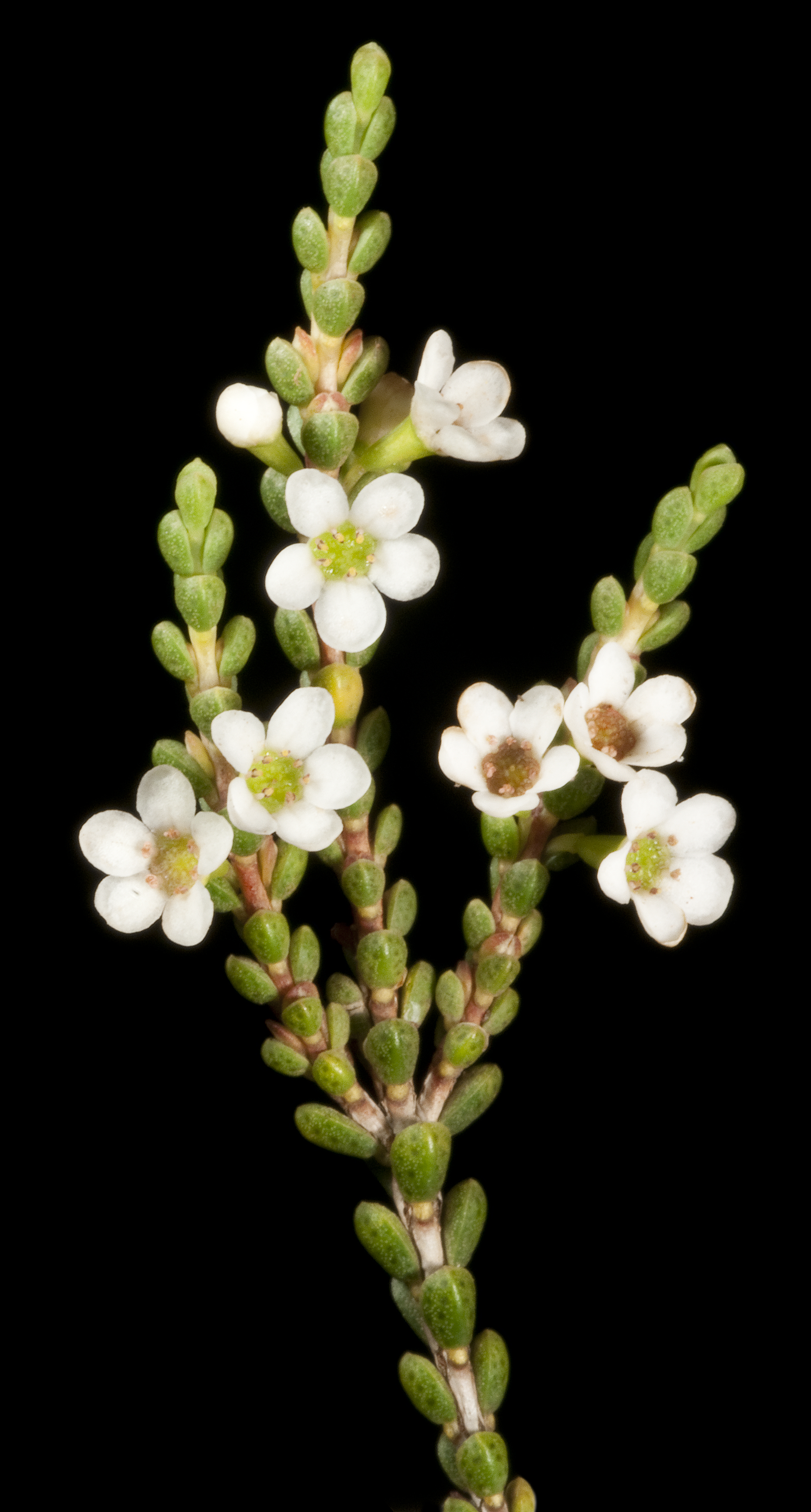

Scientific classification
- Kingdom: Plantae
- Clade: Tracheophytes
- Clade: Angiosperms
- Clade: Eudicots
- Clade: Rosids
- Order: Myrtales
- Family: Myrtaceae
- Genus: Micromyrtus
- Species: M. erichsenii

Binomial name
- Micromyrtus erichsenii Hemsl.

= Micromyrtus erichsenii =

Species of shrub

Micromyrtus erichsenii is a species of the family Myrtaceae and is endemic to Western Australia. It is an erect shrub with small, egg-shaped leaves with the narrower end towards the base, and white or cream-coloured flowers 3–4 mm (0.12–0.16 in) in diameter and 5 to 10 stamens.

== Description ==
Micromyrtus erichsenii is an erect shrub that typically grows to 0.3–2.0 m (1 ft 0 in – 6 ft 7 in) high. Its leaves are erect to almost pressed against the stem, egg-shaped with the narrower end towards the base, 1.2–2.4 mm (0.047–0.094 in) long and 0.8–1.2 mm (0.031–0.047 in) wide on a petiole 0.3–0.5 mm (0.012–0.020 in) long. The flowers are about 3–4 mm (0.12–0.16 in) in diameter, and arranged in up to 9 upper leaf axils on a peduncle 1.3–2 mm (0.051–0.079 in) long with egg-shaped bracteoles 0.6–1 mm (0.024–0.039 in) long but that fall off as the flower opens. The sepals are broadly egg-shaped, 0.2–0.6 mm (0.0079–0.0236 in) wide and the petals are white or cream-coloured, broadly egg-shaped with the narrower end towards the base and 1.1–1.6 mm (0.043–0.063 in) long. There are 5 to 10 stamens, the anthers about 0.2 mm (0.0079 in) long. Flowering occurs between February and November and the fruit is 1.3–1.7 mm (0.051–0.067 in) long and 0.7–1 mm (0.028–0.039 in) wide containing a single seed.

== Taxonomy ==
Micromyrtus erichsenii was first formally described in 1905 by William Hensley in Hooker's Icones Plantarum from specimens collected near Dedari. The specific epithet (erichsenii) honours Frederick Ole Erickson.

== Distribution and habitat ==
This species grows on sandplains in shrubland or open woodland between Merredin, Coolgardie, Newdegate and Norseman.
