= Micromyrtus hymenonema =

Scientific classification
- Kingdom: Plantae
- Clade: Tracheophytes
- Clade: Angiosperms
- Clade: Eudicots
- Clade: Rosids
- Order: Myrtales
- Family: Myrtaceae
- Genus: Micromyrtus
- Species: M. hymenonema

Binomial name
- Micromyrtus hymenonema (F.Muell.) C.A.Gardner

Synonyms
- Thryptomene hymenonema F.Muell.

Species of shrub

Micromyrtus hymenonema is a species of flowering plant in the myrtle family, Myrtaceae and is endemic to inland areas of Western Australia. It is a shrub with overlapping, decussate linear leaves and pink flowers arranged singly in leaf axils with about 10 stamens in each flower.

== Description ==
Micromyrtus hexamera is a shrub that typically grows up to 0.4–0.7 cm (0.16–0.28 in) high. Its leaves are linear, overlapping and decussate, 2–4 mm (0.079–0.157 in) long, 1.0–1.5 mm (0.039–0.059 in) wide and more or less sessile. The leaves have a small point on the tip and a few prominent oil glands. The flowers are 3–4 mm (0.12–0.16 in) long and arranged singly in leaf axils on a peduncle about 0.7 mm (0.028 in) long, with 2 petal-like bracteoles 1.2–1.8 mm (0.047–0.071 in) long at the base. The sepals are egg-shaped, 1.0–1.8 mm (0.039–0.071 in) long, and petal-like and the petals are pink, joined at the base to form a top-shaped tube 1.0–1.5 mm (0.039–0.059 in) long, with more or less round lobes 2.7 mm (0.11 in) long. There are 10 stamens give or take one, the filaments 0.5–1.0 mm (0.020–0.039 in) long. Flowering occurs from June to October.

== Taxonomy ==
This species was first formally described in 1876 by Ferdinand von Mueller who gave it the name Thryptomene hymenonema in his Fragmenta phytographiae Australiae from specimens collected near Victoria Spring by Jess Young. In 1931 Charles Gardner transferred the species to the genus Micromyrtus as M. hymenonema. The specific epithet (hymenonema) means "membrane thread", referring to the flat, membraneous filaments.

== Distribution and habitat ==
This species of micromyrtus grows on sand dunes with spinifex in an area 750 km (470 mi) long north-east of Kalgoorlie in the Central Ranges, Coolgardie, Great Victoria Desert and Murchison bioregions of inland Western Australia.
