= Micromyrtus vernicosa =

Scientific classification
- Kingdom: Plantae
- Clade: Tracheophytes
- Clade: Angiosperms
- Clade: Eudicots
- Clade: Rosids
- Order: Myrtales
- Family: Myrtaceae
- Genus: Micromyrtus
- Species: M. vernicosa

Binomial name
- Micromyrtus vernicosa A.R.Bean

Species of shrub

Micromyrtus vernicosa is a species of flowering plant in the myrtle family, Myrtaceae and is endemic to a south-eastern Queensland. It is a spreading shrub with overlapping lance-shaped leaves with the narrower end towards the base, and small white flowers arranged singly in leaf axils with 5 stamens in each flower.

== Description ==
Micromyrtus vernicosa is a spreading shrub that typically grows up to 2 m (6 ft 7 in) high and wide and has more or less drooping branchlets. It has overlapping, lance-shaped leaves with the narrower end towards the base, 1.5–2.5 mm (0.059–0.098 in) long, 0.5–0.6 mm (0.020–0.024 in) wide on a petiole 0.25 mm (0.0098 in) long. The leaves are glabrous and glossy with prominent oil glands. The flowers are 1.9–2.1 mm (0.075–0.083 in) wide and arranged singly in leaf axils on a peduncle 0.5–1.0 mm (0.020–0.039 in) long, with 2 translucent bracteoles about 0.7 mm (0.028 in) long at the base. There are 5 more or less round sepals lobes 0.3–0.4 mm (0.012–0.016 in) long and 0.5–0.6 mm (0.020–0.024 in) wide, and 5 white, elliptical petals 0.8–1.0 mm (0.031–0.039 in) long and 0.6–0.7 mm (0.024–0.028 in) wide. There are 5 stamens, the filaments about 0.4 mm (0.016 in) long and the style is 0.3 mm (0.012 in) long. Flowering has been observed in May and June.

== Taxonomy ==
Micromyrtus vernicosa was first formally described in 1997 by Anthony Bean in the journal Austrobaileya from specimens collected in Mount Walsh National Park. The specific epithet (vernicosa) means "varnished", referring to the glossy leaves.

== Distribution and habitat ==
This species of micromyrtus is endemic to Mount Walsh where it grows in rocky soils in heathland.

== Conservation status ==
Micromyrtus vernicosa is listed as "vulnerable" under the Queensland Government Nature Conservation Act 1992.
