= Micromyrtus prochytes =

Scientific classification
- Kingdom: Plantae
- Clade: Tracheophytes
- Clade: Angiosperms
- Clade: Eudicots
- Clade: Rosids
- Order: Myrtales
- Family: Myrtaceae
- Genus: Micromyrtus
- Species: M. prochytes

Binomial name
- Micromyrtus prochytes Rye

Species of shrub

Micromyrtus prochytes is species of the flowering plant in the family Myrtaceae and is endemic to inland areas of Western Australia. It is an erect shrub with narrowly egg-shaped leaves with the narrower end toward the base, and white or pink flowers 3.0–4.0 mm (0.12–0.16 in) in diameter.

== Description ==
Micromyrtus prochytes is an erect shrub that typically grows to 0.5–2 m (1 ft 8 in – 6 ft 7 in) high and at least 1 m (3 ft 3 in) wide and has erect leaves densely arranged on its smaller branchlets. Its leaves are narrowly egg-shaped with the narrower end towards the base, 2.5–3.5 mm (0.098–0.138 in) long and 0.6–1.0 mm (0.024–0.039 in) wide on a petiole 0.4–0.6 mm (0.016–0.024 in) long. The flowers are 3.0–4.0 mm (0.12–0.16 in) in diameter, and arranged in between 2 and 10 upper leaf axils on a peduncle 1.0–3.3 mm (0.039–0.130 in) long. The sepals are 0.1–0.35 mm (0.0039–0.0138 in) long and 0.4–0.9 mm (0.016–0.035 in) wide and the petals are white or pink, often pink at first and later white, 1.3–1.5 mm (0.051–0.059 in) long. The anthers are 0.25–0.35 mm (0.0098–0.0138 in) long and the style is 0.3–0.4 mm (0.012–0.016 in) wide. Flowering occurs between May and September, with a peak from winter to spring, and the fruit is 2.4–3.0 mm (0.094–0.118 in) long and about 1.0–1.3 mm (0.039–0.051 in) wide, containing a seed 2.0–2.5 mm (0.079–0.098 in) long.

== Taxonomy ==
Micromyrtus prochytes was first formally described in 2010 by Barbara Lynette Rye in the journal Nuytsia from specimens collected by John Stanley Beard near Paynes Find in 1973. This species was originally described in an unpublished manuscript by John Green as Micromyrtus racemosa var. prochytes, but raised to species status as Micromyrtus prochytes by Rye. The meaning of the specific epithet (prochytes) is uncertain, since it was not explained by Green.

== Distribution and habitat ==
This species grows on granite outcrops and other rocky habitats between Woolgorong Station near Mullewa to Wurarga near Yalgoo in the Avon Wheatbelt, Murchison, and Yalgoo bioregions of inland Western Australia.

== Conservation status ==
Micromyrtus mucronulata is listed as "not threatened" by the Government of Western Australia Department of Biodiversity, Conservation and Attractions.
