= Micromyrtus arenicola =

Scientific classification
- Kingdom: Plantae
- Clade: Tracheophytes
- Clade: Angiosperms
- Clade: Eudicots
- Clade: Rosids
- Order: Myrtales
- Family: Myrtaceae
- Genus: Micromyrtus
- Species: M. arenicola

Binomial name
- Micromyrtus arenicola Rye

Species of shrub

Micromyrtus arenicola is a species of flowering plant in the myrtle family, Myrtaceae and is endemic to a small area in the southwest of Western Australia. It is an erect shrub with small, linear to narrowly egg-shaped leaves and small white flowers.

== Description ==
Micromyrtus arenicola is an erect shrub that typically grows to a height of 0.7–1.4 m (2 ft 4 in – 4 ft 7 in). Its leaves are directed upwards, sometimes densely crowded, linear to narrowly egg-shaped with the narrower end towards the base, 2.2–4 mm (0.087–0.157 in) long and 0.8–1.4 mm (0.031–0.055 in) wide on a petiole 0.4–0.8 mm (0.016–0.031 in) long, with four to seven prominent oil glands. The flowers are 3.5–4.0 mm (0.14–0.16 in) in diameter, and arranged in 4 to 12 upper leaf axils on a peduncle 1.5–2.2 mm (0.059–0.087 in) long with narrowly egg-shaped bracteoles 1.7–2.3 mm (0.067–0.091 in) long at the base. The sepals are egg-shaped, 0.4–0.7 mm (0.016–0.028 in) long and the petals are white, broadly egg-shaped with the narrower end towards the base, and 1.5–2.0 mm (0.059–0.079 in) long. There are ten stamens, the filaments 0.3–0.4 mm (0.012–0.016 in) long. Flowering has been recorded from early April to September.

== Taxonomy ==
Micromyrtus arenicola was first formally described in 2010 by Barbara Lynette Rye in the journal Nuytsia from specimens collected near Yuna in 2003. The specific epithet (arenicola) means "native of sandy places", referring to the habitat of this species.

== Distribution and habitat ==
This species of micromyrtus mainly grows in sand from near Binnu and the Bindoo Hill Nature Reserve in the Geraldton Sandplains bioregion of south-western Western Australia.

== Conservation status ==
Micromyrtus arenicola is classified as "not threatened" by the Government of Western Australia Department of Biodiversity, Conservation and Attractions.
