= Micromyrtus navicularis =

Conservation status
- Priority Three — Poorly Known Taxa (DEC)

Scientific classification
- Kingdom: Plantae
- Clade: Tracheophytes
- Clade: Angiosperms
- Clade: Eudicots
- Clade: Rosids
- Order: Myrtales
- Family: Myrtaceae
- Genus: Micromyrtus
- Species: M. navicularis

Binomial name
- Micromyrtus navicularis Rye

Species of shrub

Micromyrtus navicularis is a species of flowering plant in the myrtle family, Myrtaceae and is endemic to a small area in the south of Western Australia. It is an erect shrub with narrowly egg-shaped leaves, and small white flowers in upper leaf axils with 10 stamens in each flower.

== Description ==
Micromyrtus navicularis is an erect shrub that typically grows to a height of 0.5–1.6 m (1 ft 8 in – 5 ft 3 in). It has a single stem at the base, long leaves on short lower branches, and tall spindly stems with shorter leaves pressed against the stem. The leaves are very narrowly egg-shaped with the narrower end towards the base or boat-shaped, 3.0–4.5 mm (0.12–0.18 in) long and 0.5–0.7 mm (0.020–0.028 in) wide on a petiole 0.3–0.4 mm (0.012–0.016 in) long, with 8 to 14 prominent glands. The upper surface of the leaves is very concave, the lower surface very convex. The flowers are 3–4 mm (0.12–0.16 in) in diameter, and arranged in 6 to 20 upper leaf axils on a peduncle 1–2 mm (0.039–0.079 in) long with narrowly oblong bracteoles 1.3–1.8 mm (0.051–0.071 in) long at the base but that fall off as the flowers develop. The sepals are egg-shaped to almost round, 0.2–0.4 mm (0.0079–0.0157 in) long and 0.35–0.5 mm (0.014–0.020 in) wide. The petals are white, egg-shaped with the narrower end towards the base, and 1.3–1.8 mm (0.051–0.071 in) long. There are 10 stamens in each flower, the filaments about 0.1–0.2 mm (0.0039–0.0079 in) long.

== Taxonomy ==
Micromyrtus navicularis was first formally described in 2006 by Barbara Lynette Rye in the journal Nuytsia from specimens collected near Mount Short, 14 km (8.7 mi) north-north-west of Ravensthorpe by Peter Gordon Wilson in 1968. The specific epithet (navicularis) means "boat-shaped", referring shape of the leaves.

== Distribution and habitat ==
This species of micromyrtus grows in mallee, usually in gravelly sandy soils over granite or laterite, and is restricted to the range of hills near Ravensthorpe in the Esperance Plains and Mallee bioregions of southern Western Australia.

== Conservation status ==
Micromyrtus navicularis is classified as "Priority Three" by the Government of Western Australia Department of Parks and Wildlife meaning that it is poorly known and known from only a few locations but is not under imminent threat.
