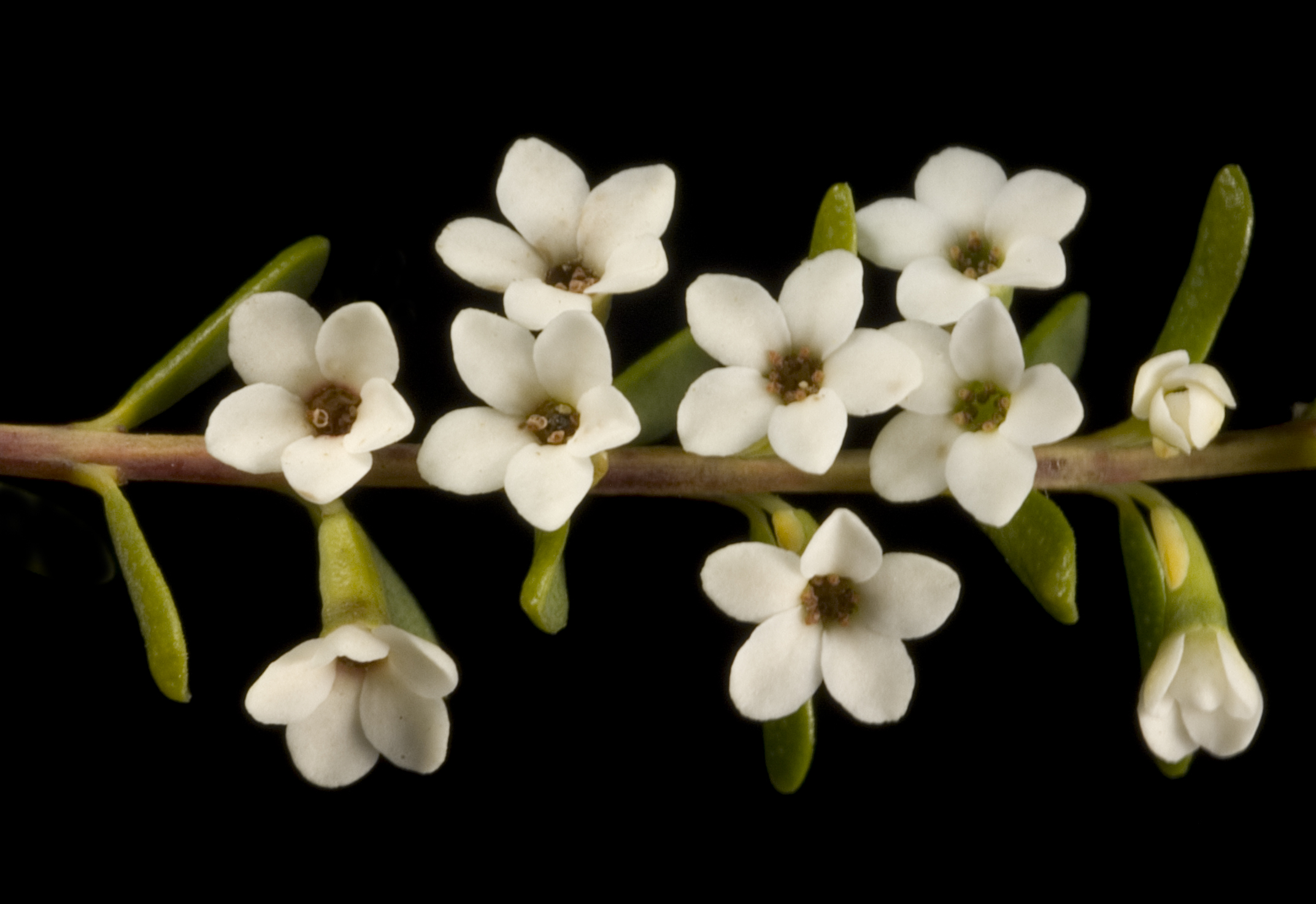

Scientific classification
- Kingdom: Plantae
- Clade: Tracheophytes
- Clade: Angiosperms
- Clade: Eudicots
- Clade: Rosids
- Order: Myrtales
- Family: Myrtaceae
- Genus: Micromyrtus
- Species: M. triptycha

Binomial name
- Micromyrtus triptycha Rye

= Micromyrtus triptycha =

Species of shrub

Micromyrtus triptycha is a species of flowering plant in the family Myrtaceae and is endemic to the south-west of Western Australia. It is an erect, open shrub with narrowly egg-shaped leaves with the narrower end towards the base, and yellow, white or cream-coloured flowers with 10 stamens.

== Description ==
Micromyrtus triptycha is an erect, open shrub that typically grows to a height of 10–50 cm (3.9–19.7 in), but sometimes up to 1.4 m (4 ft 7 in) high. Its leaves are narrowly egg-shaped with the narrower end towards the base, 2–6 mm (0.079–0.236 in) long and 1.2–2.3 mm (0.047–0.091 in) long on a petiole 0.4–0.5 mm (0.016–0.020 in) long usually with a 6 to 10 oil glands on the lower surface. The flowers are arranged in racemes in 6 to 16 upper leaf axils and are 3.0–4.3 mm (0.12–0.17 in) in diameter on a peduncle 0.5–1.3 mm (0.020–0.051 in) long. The floral tube is flattened and 1.9–3.0 mm (0.075–0.118 in) long with 10 ribs. The sepals are 0.3–0.5 mm (0.012–0.020 in) long and 0.5–0.7 mm (0.020–0.028 in) wide and the petals are egg-shaped with the narrower end towards the base, and yellow, white or cream-coloured, sometimes tinged with pink, 1.3–2.0 mm (0.051–0.079 in) long. Flowering mainly occurs from April to November and the fruit is about 1.6–2.2 mm (0.063–0.087 in) long, containing a single seed.

== Taxonomy ==
Micromyrtus triptycha was first formally described in 2006 by Barbara Lynette Rye in the journal Nuytsia from specimens collected by John Green 25.4 km (15.8 mi) east of Lake Grace in 1975. The specific epithet (triptycha) means "three-fold" or "triple", referring to the appearance of the anthers.

== Distribution and habitat ==
Micromyrtus triptycha grows on sand plains, hills, slopes and disturbed areas between Harrismith, Hyden and Lake King in the Avon Wheatbelt, Coolgardie and Mallee bioregions in the south-west of Western Australia.

== Conservation status ==
This species of micromyrtus is listed as "not threatened" by the Western Australian Government Department of Biodiversity, Conservation and Attractions.
