= Micromyrtus papillosa =

Conservation status
- Priority One — Poorly Known Taxa (DEC)

Scientific classification
- Kingdom: Plantae
- Clade: Tracheophytes
- Clade: Angiosperms
- Clade: Eudicots
- Clade: Rosids
- Order: Myrtales
- Family: Myrtaceae
- Genus: Micromyrtus
- Species: M. papillosa

Binomial name
- Micromyrtus papillosa (J.W.Green) Rye

Species of shrub

Micromyrtus papillosa is a species of flowering plant in the family Myrtaceae and is endemic to the south-west of Western Australia. It is sometimes an erect or low, otherwise spreading shrub with egg-shaped leaves with the narrower end towards the base, and white flowers with 5 stamens.

== Description ==
Micromyrtus papillosa is an erect or low and spreading shrub that typically grows to a height of 0.4–1.2 m (1 ft 4 in – 3 ft 11 in) and 0.4–1.5 m (1 ft 4 in – 4 ft 11 in) wide. Its leaves are egg-shaped with the narrower end towards the base, 1.5–3.5 mm (0.059–0.138 in) long, 1.4–1.7 mm (0.055–0.067 in) wide on a petiole 0.4–0.6 mm (0.016–0.024 in) long with 8 to 12 prominent oil glands. The flowers are borne in racemes in 5 to 20 leaf axils near the ends of branches on a peduncle 0.4–0.6 mm (0.016–0.024 in) long with bracteoles 0.6–1.0 mm (0.024–0.039 in) long, but which fall off as the flowers open. The flowers are 3–4 mm (0.12–0.16 in) in diameter with sepals 0.3–0.5 mm (0.012–0.020 in) long. The petals are white, 1.3–1.6 mm (0.051–0.063 in) long with 5 stamens in each flower. Flowering occurs from August to early October.

== Taxonomy ==
Micromyrtus papillosa was first formally described in 2002 by Barbara Lynette Rye in the journal Nuytsia from an unpublished description by John Green from specimens collected on Beacon Hill near Norseman in 1968. The specific epithet (papillosa) means "papillose", referring to the floral tube.

== Distribution and habitat ==
This species of micromyrtus is found on hills and scattered among rocky outcrops in the area between Wubin, Lake Grace and Southern Cross in the Coolgardie bioregion of south-western Western Australia.

== Conservation status ==
Micromyrtus papillosa is listed as "Priority One" by the Government of Western Australia Department of Biodiversity, Conservation and Attractions, meaning that it is known from only one or a few locations which are potentially at risk.
