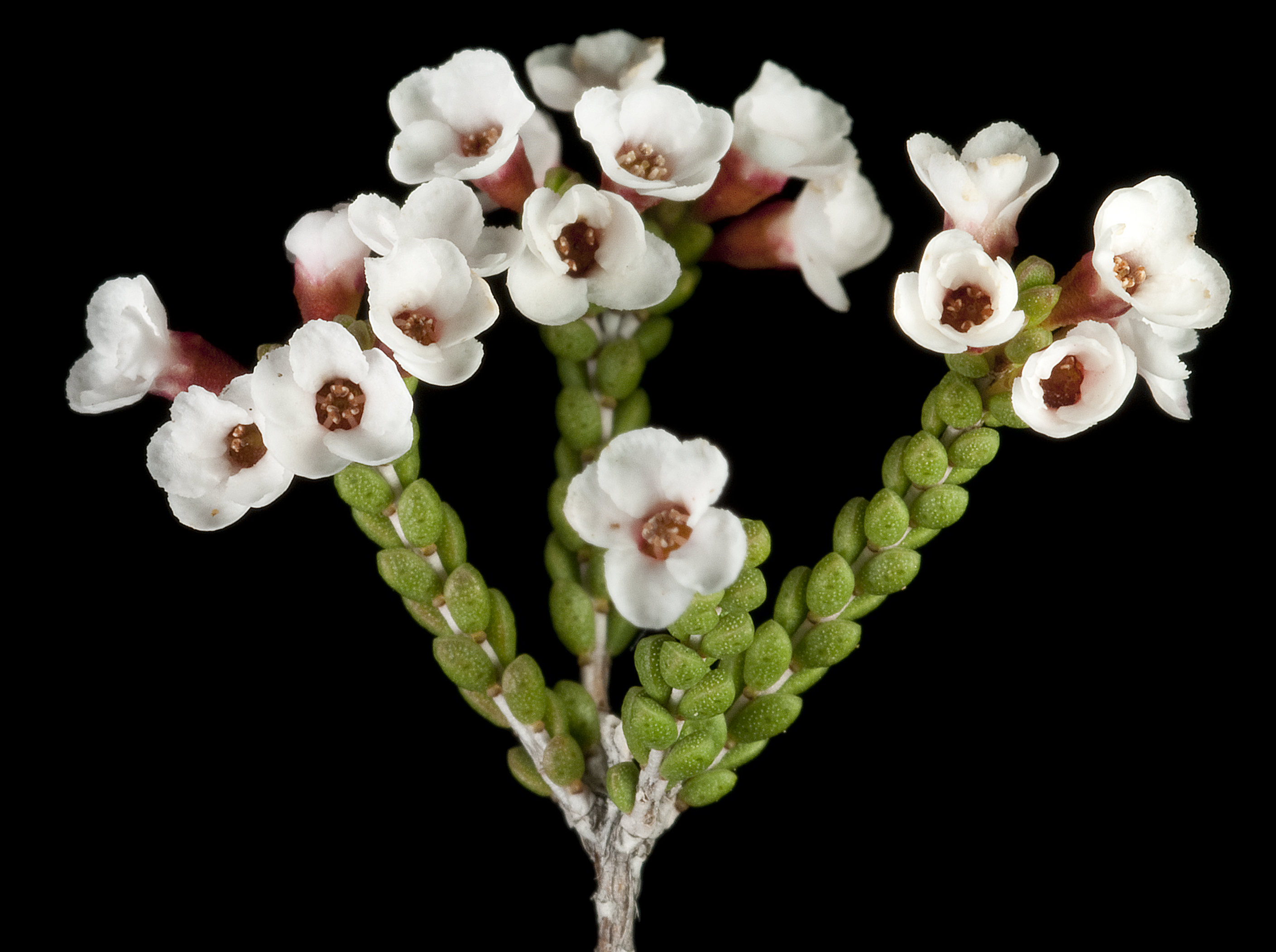

Conservation status
- Priority One — Poorly Known Taxa (DEC)P1

Scientific classification
- Kingdom: Plantae
- Clade: Tracheophytes
- Clade: Angiosperms
- Clade: Eudicots
- Clade: Rosids
- Order: Myrtales
- Family: Myrtaceae
- Genus: Micromyrtus
- Species: M. redita

Binomial name
- Micromyrtus redita Rye

= Micromyrtus redita =

Species of shrub

Micromyrtus redita is species of the flowering plant in the family Myrtaceae and is endemic to the south-west of Western Australia. It is a densely branched shrub with narrowly oblong to elliptic leaves, reddish sepals and white or pink petals.

== Description ==
Micromyrtus redits is a densely-branched shrub. Its leaves are narrowly oblong to elliptic, 1.2–2.4 mm (0.047–0.094 in) long, about 0.6 mm (0.024 in) wide on a petiole about 0.2 mm (0.0079 in) long with 2 to 6 prominent glands on the lower surface. The flowers are arranged in upper leaf axils on a peduncle 0.6–1.1 mm (0.024–0.043 in) long and are about 3 mm (0.12 in) in diameter. The 5 sepals are 0.4–0.5 mm (0.016–0.020 in) long and 0.8–0.6 mm (0.031–0.024 in) wide and reddish. The petals are widely spreading when in flower, white or tinged with pink, 1.3–1.5 mm (0.051–0.059 in) long and the anthers are about 0.30 mm (0.012 in) long and the style is about 0.5 mm (0.020 in) long.

== Taxonomy ==
Micromyrtus redita was first formally described in 2006 by Barbara Lynette Rye in the journal Nuytsia from specimens collected near Wongan Hills. The specific epithet (redita) means "returned", referring to the fact that the type specimens were once lost.

== Distribution ==
This species of micromyrtus grows in the Avon Wheatbelt and Coolgardie bioregions of south-western Western Australia.

== Conservation status ==
Micromyrtus redita is listed as "Priority One" by the Western Australian Government Department of Biodiversity, Conservation and Attractions, meaning that it is known from only one or a few locations which are potentially at risk.
