= Micromyrtus trudgenii =

Conservation status
- Priority Three — Poorly Known Taxa (DEC)

Scientific classification
- Kingdom: Plantae
- Clade: Tracheophytes
- Clade: Angiosperms
- Clade: Eudicots
- Clade: Rosids
- Order: Myrtales
- Family: Myrtaceae
- Genus: Micromyrtus
- Species: M. trudgenii

Binomial name
- Micromyrtus trudgenii Rye

Species of shrub

Micromyrtus trudgenii is a species of flowering plant in the family Myrtaceae and is endemic to a small area of inland Western Australia. It is an erect, open shrub with narrowly egg-shaped leaves with the narrower end towards the base, and yellow flowers with 10 stamens.

== Description ==
Micromyrtus trudgenii is an erect, open shrub that typically grows to a height of 1–2 m (3 ft 3 in – 6 ft 7 in) and at least 1 m (3 ft 3 in) wide. Its leaves are very narrowly egg-shaped with the narrower end towards the base, 4–9 mm (0.16–0.35 in) long and 0.4–0.6 mm (0.016–0.024 in) wide on a petiole 0.4–0.7 mm (0.016–0.028 in) long usually with 7 to 17 oil glands on each side of the midvein. The flowers are arranged in racemes in 6 to 15 upper leaf axils and are usually 3.0–3.5 mm (0.12–0.14 in) in diameter on a peduncle 0.8–2 mm (0.031–0.079 in) long. The floral tube is terete and 2 mm (0.079 in) long with 10 ribs. The sepals are about 0.2 mm (0.0079 in) long and 0.4–0.5 mm (0.016–0.020 in) wide. The petals are yellow, widely spreading and broadly elliptic, and there are 10 stamens. Flowering has been observed between June and October and the fruit is 2.2–2.4 mm (0.087–0.094 in) long and 0.9–1.2 mm (0.035–0.047 in) wide, containing a single seed.

== Taxonomy ==
Micromyrtus trudgenii was first formally described in 2007 by Barbara Lynette Rye in the journal Nuytsia from specimens collected by Joseph Zvonko Weber west of Paynes Find in 1975. The specific epithet (trudgenii) honours Malcolm Eric Trudgen.

== Distribution and habitat ==
This species is found on the tops of hills and ridges of banded ironstone or dolerite in a small area south-east of Yalgoo in the Yalgoo bioregion of inland Western Australia.

== Conservation status ==
Micromyrtus trudgenii is listed as "Priority Three" meaning that it is poorly known and known from only a few locations but is not under imminent threat.
