= Micromyrtus rubicalyx =

Conservation status
- Priority Two — Poorly Known Taxa (DEC)

Scientific classification
- Kingdom: Plantae
- Clade: Tracheophytes
- Clade: Angiosperms
- Clade: Eudicots
- Clade: Rosids
- Order: Myrtales
- Family: Myrtaceae
- Genus: Micromyrtus
- Species: M. rubicalyx

Binomial name
- Micromyrtus rubicalyx Rye

Species of shrub

Micromyrtus rubicalyx is a plant species of the family Myrtaceae endemic to Western Australia.

The erect shrub typically grows to a height of 1 to 1.5 metres (3.3 to 4.9 ft). It blooms in September producing white flowers.

It is found on slopes in the Mid West region of Western Australia around the Chapman Valley are where it grows in clay to sandy loam soils over sandstone.
