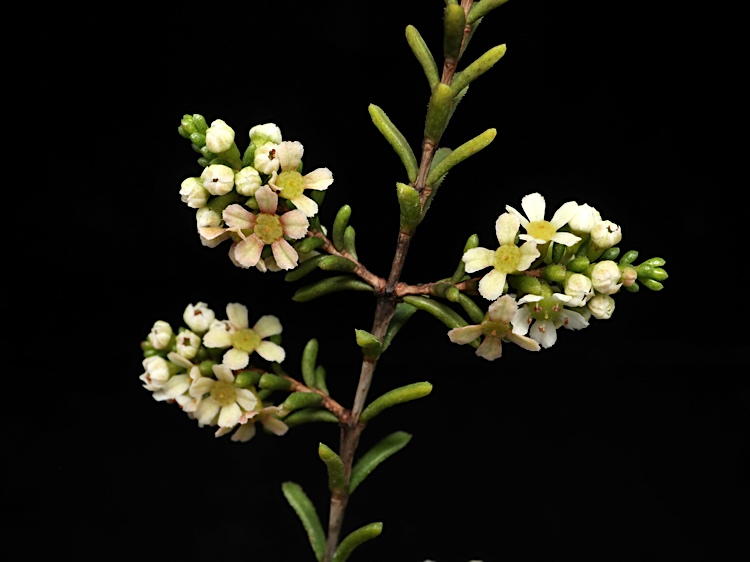
- In the Australian National Botanic Gardens

Conservation status
- Endangered (NCA)

Scientific classification
- Kingdom: Plantae
- Clade: Tracheophytes
- Clade: Angiosperms
- Clade: Eudicots
- Clade: Rosids
- Order: Myrtales
- Family: Myrtaceae
- Genus: Micromyrtus
- Species: M. delicata

Binomial name
- Micromyrtus delicata A.R.Bean

= Micromyrtus delicata =

Species of shrub

Micromyrtus delicata is a species of flowering plant in the myrtle family, Myrtaceae and is endemic to a small area of northern coastal Queensland. It is a shrub with overlapping, linear to narrowly egg-shaped leaves with the narrower end towards the base and small white flowers arranged singly in leaf axils.

== Description ==
Micromyrtus delicata is a shrub that typically grows up to 1 m (3 ft 3 in) high, with erect branchlets. Its leaves overlap each other and are linear to narrowly egg-shaped with the narrower end towards the base, 1.7–3.9 mm (0.067–0.154 in) long, 0.4–0.8 mm (0.016–0.031 in) wide and sessile or on a petiole up to 0.3 mm (0.012 in) long. The leaves have prominent oil glands and the edges of the leaves sometimes have finely toothed margins. The flowers are arranged singly in leaf axils on a peduncle 0.5–0.9 mm (0.020–0.035 in) long, each flower 2.5–3.0 mm (0.098–0.118 in) wide. There are 2 bracteoles about 0.6 mm (0.024 in) long at the base of the flower. There are 5 relatively inconspicuous, translucent sepals and 5 keeled petals 0.9–1.2 mm (0.035–0.047 in) long and 0.9–1.0 mm (0.035–0.039 in) wide. There are five stamens, each opposite a petal, the filaments 0.3–0.4 mm (0.012–0.016 in) long. Flowering has been observed between January and March.

== Taxonomy ==
Micromyrtus delicata was first formally described in 1997 by Anthony Bean in the journal Austrobaileya from specimens collected 4 km (2.5 mi) west of Herberton by Paul Irwin Forster in 1994. The specific epithet (delicata) means "charming", referring to the foliage of this species.

== Distribution and habitat ==
This species of micromyrtus is only known from the type location in central eastern Queensland, where it grows in open woodland.

== Conservation status ==
Micromytus delicata is listed as "endangered" under the Queensland Government Nature Conservation Act 1992.
