= Micromyrtus capricornia =

Scientific classification
- Kingdom: Plantae
- Clade: Tracheophytes
- Clade: Angiosperms
- Clade: Eudicots
- Clade: Rosids
- Order: Myrtales
- Family: Myrtaceae
- Genus: Micromyrtus
- Species: M. capricornia

Binomial name
- Micromyrtus capricornia A.R.Bean

Species of shrub

Micromyrtus capricornia is a species of flowering plant in the myrtle family, Myrtaceae and is endemic to a small area of central eastern Queensland. It is a shrub with slightly drooping branchlets, overlapping, narrowly egg-shaped leaves and small white flowers.

== Description ==
Micromyrtus capricornia is a shrub that typically grows to a height of up to 2.5 m (8 ft 2 in) and has slightly pendulous branchlets. Its leaves overlap each other, egg-shaped with the narrower end towards the base, 1.5–2.5 mm (0.059–0.098 in) long, 0.5–1 mm (0.020–0.039 in) wide on a petiole 0.20–0.25 mm (0.0079–0.0098 in) long with prominent oil glands. The flowers are arranged singly in leaf axils on a peduncle 0.5–1 mm (0.020–0.039 in) long with 2 bracteoles about 0.8 mm (0.031 in) long at the base, but that fall off as the flowers open. The 5 sepal lobes are more or less round, 0.20–0.25 mm (0.0079–0.0098 in) long and 0.5–0.6 mm (0.020–0.024 in) wide. The 5 petals are white, round to egg-shaped and 1.0–1.4 mm (0.039–0.055 in) long and 1.0–1.3 mm (0.039–0.051 in) wide. There are five stamens, each opposite a petal, the filaments about 0.3 mm (0.012 in) long. Flowering occurs throughout the year.

== Taxonomy ==
Micromyrtus capricornia was first formally described in 1997 by Anthony Bean in the journal Austrobaileya from specimens collected near Comet in 1993. The specific epithet (capricornia) refers to the Tropic of Capricorn, near to which this species occurs.

== Distribution and habitat ==
This species of micromyrtus grows on ridge tops from Mount Coolon to near Rolleston in a narrow band about 150 km (93 mi) from the coast of central eastern Queensland.
