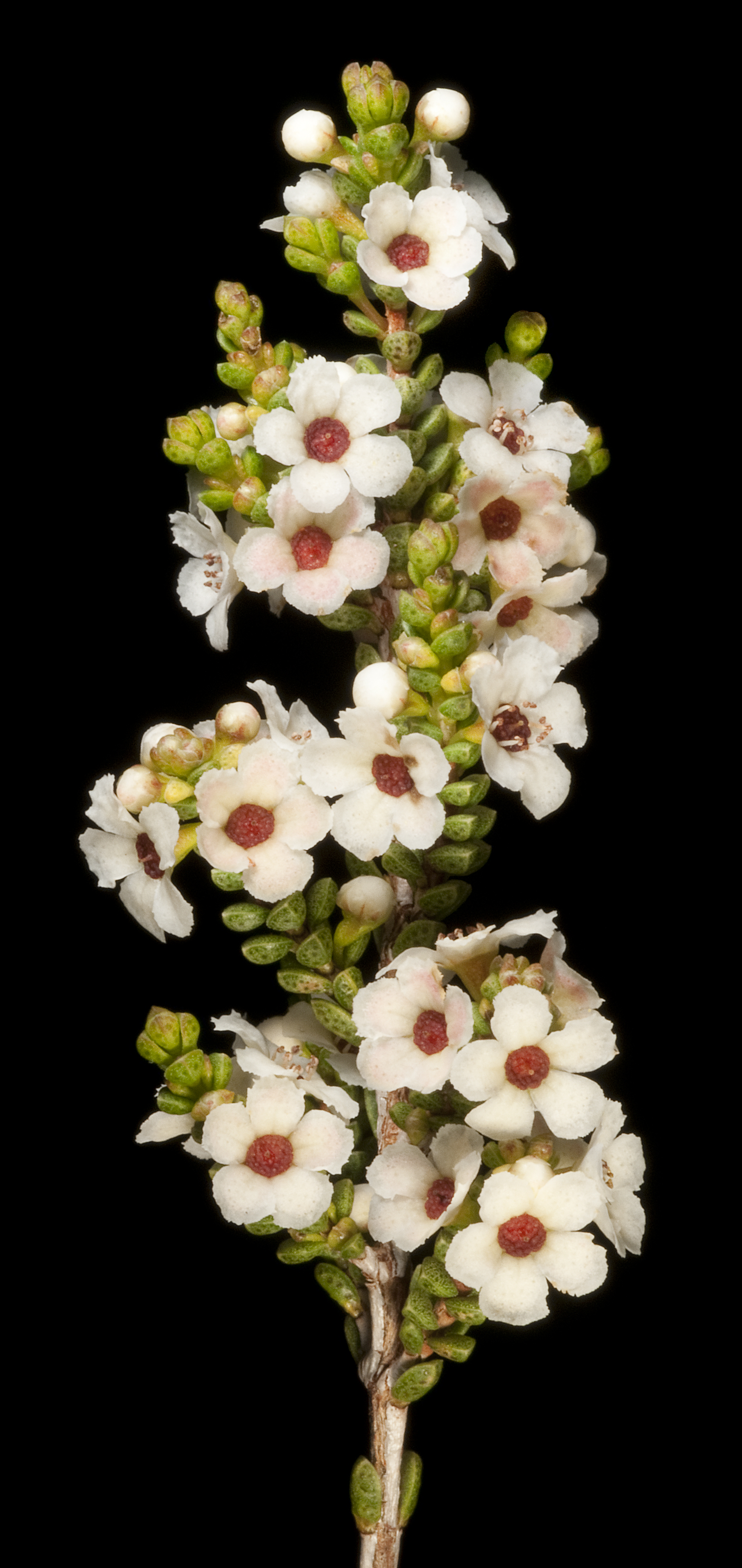

Scientific classification
- Kingdom: Plantae
- Clade: Tracheophytes
- Clade: Angiosperms
- Clade: Eudicots
- Clade: Rosids
- Order: Myrtales
- Family: Myrtaceae
- Genus: Micromyrtus
- Species: M. monotaxis

Binomial name
- Micromyrtus monotaxis Rye

= Micromyrtus monotaxis =

Species of shrub

Micromyrtus monotaxis species of the family Myrtaceae and is endemic to the Western Australia. It is an erect shrub with egg-shaped leaves with the narrower end toward the base, white flowers 4.5–6.0 mm (0.18–0.24 in) in diameter, and 10 stamens.

== Description ==
Micromyrtus monotaxis is an erect shrub that typically grows to 0.7–1.6 m (2 ft 4 in – 5 ft 3 in) high and has its leaves densely arranged on smaller branchlets. Its leaves are erect to almost pressed against the stem, egg-shaped to broadly egg-shaped with the narrower end towards the base, 1.7–3.5 mm (0.067–0.138 in) long and 1.3–1.5 mm (0.051–0.059 in) wide on a petiole 0.3–0.4 mm (0.012–0.016 in) long. The flowers are 4.5–6.0 mm (0.18–0.24 in) in diameter, and arranged in between 2 and 8 upper leaf axils on a peduncle 1.0–2.5 mm (0.039–0.098 in) long. The sepals are broadly egg-shaped, 0.5–1.0 mm (0.020–0.039 in) wide and white. The petals are white, very broadly egg-shaped with the narrower end towards the base and 1.9–2.4 mm (0.075–0.094 in) long. There are 10 stamens, the anthers 0.6–0.9 mm (0.024–0.035 in) long. Flowering occurs between March and December, with a peak between August and October and the fruit is about 1.8 mm (0.071 in) long and 1.3 mm (0.051 in) wide, containing a single seed.

== Taxonomy ==
Micromyrtus monotaxis was first formally described in 2002 by Barbara Lynette Rye in the journal Nuytsia from specimens collected in 1995. The specific epithet (monotaxis) means "single row", referring to the arrangement of the stamens.

== Distribution and habitat ==
This species grows on yellow sandplains and in reddish soil near Comet Vale, between the Die Hardy Range, Comet Vale and Coolgardie in the Coolgardie and Murchison bioregions of Western Australia.
