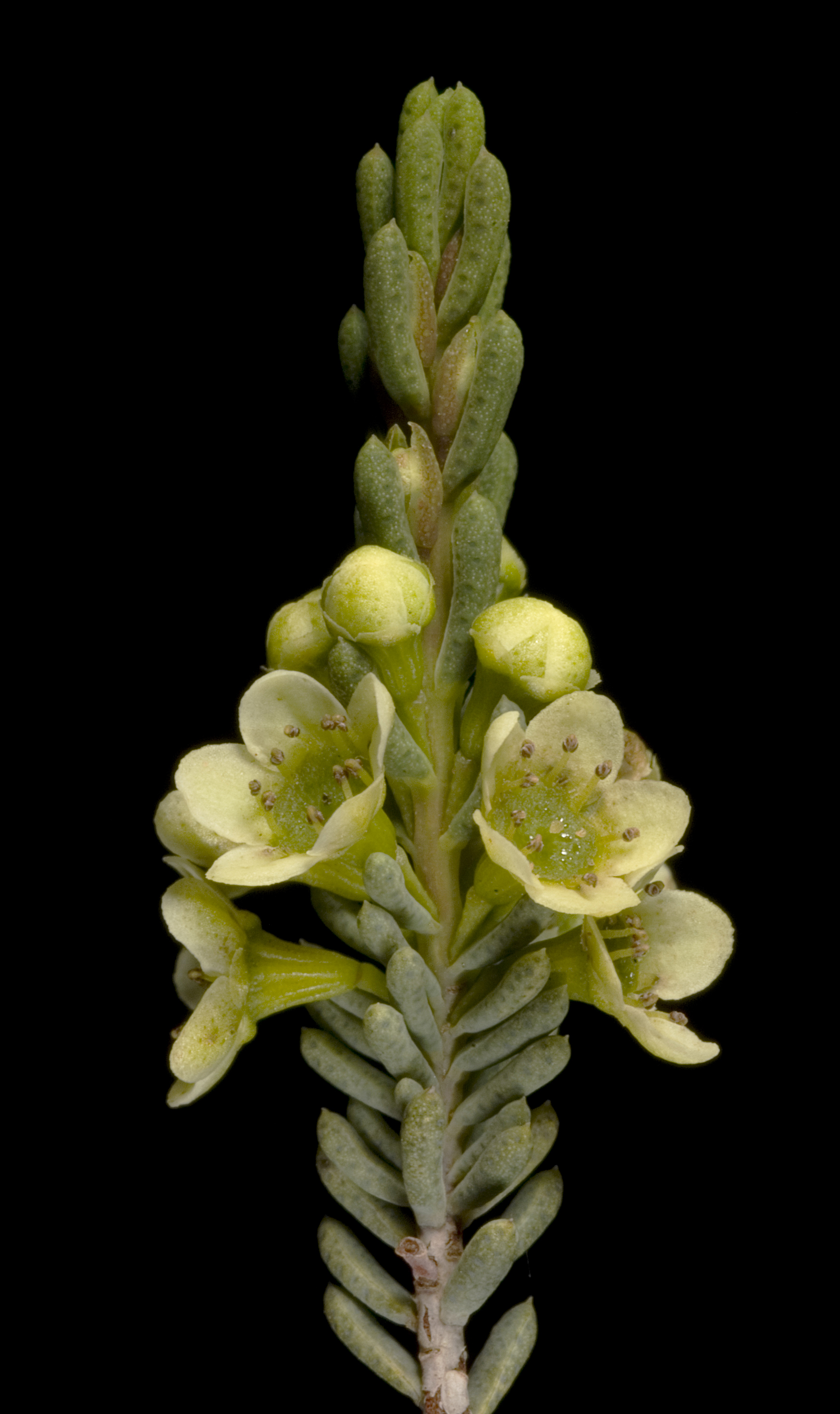

Scientific classification
- Kingdom: Plantae
- Clade: Tracheophytes
- Clade: Angiosperms
- Clade: Eudicots
- Clade: Rosids
- Order: Myrtales
- Family: Myrtaceae
- Genus: Micromyrtus
- Species: M. sulphurea

Binomial name
- Micromyrtus sulphurea W.Fitzg.

= Micromyrtus sulphurea =

Species of shrub

Micromyrtus sulphurea is a species of flowering plant in the family Myrtaceae and is endemic to the inland of Western Australia. It is a commonly stunted or widely spreading shrub with narrowly oblong leaves pressed against the stem, and yellow flowers with 10 stamens.

== Description ==
Micromyrtus sulphurea is a commonly stunted or widely-spreading shrub that typically grows to a height of 0.5–1.5 m (1 ft 8 in – 4 ft 11 in). Its leaves are narrowly oblong and more or less pressed against the stem, 2–4 mm (0.079–0.157 in) long and 0.5–0.7 mm (0.020–0.028 in) long on a petiole up to 0.3 mm (0.012 in) long with a 5 to 10 oil glands on the lower surface. The flowers are arranged in racemes in 2 to 10 upper leaf axils and are 3.5–4.5 mm (0.14–0.18 in) in diameter on a peduncle mostly 0.8–1.5 mm (0.031–0.059 in) long. The floral tube is cylindrical and 2–3 mm (0.079–0.118 in) long, the sepals widely spreading, 0.2–0.4 mm (0.0079–0.0157 in) long and 0.5–0.9 mm (0.020–0.035 in) wide and yellow. The petals are very broadly egg-shaped with the narrower end towards the base, and sulfur-yellow, 1.2–1.4 mm (0.047–0.055 in) long. Flowering has mostly been recorded from August to October and the fruit is about 1.3–1.5 mm (0.051–0.059 in) long, containing a single seed.

== Taxonomy ==
Micromyrtus sulphurea was first formally described in 1904 by William Vincent Fitzgerald in the Journal of the West Australian Natural History Society from specimens he collected "½ mile west of Mount Magnet". The specific epithet (sulphurea) means "like sulphur".

== Distribution and habitat ==
Micromyrtus sulphurea grows on sand dunes, sandplains on breakaways and granite outcrops from near Lake Rason to Queen Victoria Spring in the Gascoyne, Murchison and Yalgoo bioregions of inland Western Australia.

== Conservation status ==
This species of micromyrtus is listed as "not threatened" by the Western Australian Government Department of Biodiversity, Conservation and Attractions.
