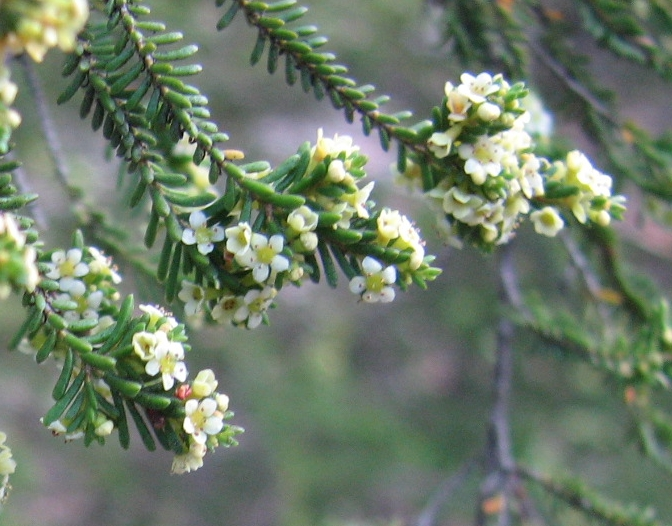
- In Maranoa Gardens

Scientific classification
- Kingdom: Plantae
- Clade: Tracheophytes
- Clade: Angiosperms
- Clade: Eudicots
- Clade: Rosids
- Order: Myrtales
- Family: Myrtaceae
- Genus: Micromyrtus
- Species: M. leptocalyx

Binomial name
- Micromyrtus leptocalyx (F.Muell.) Benth.

Synonyms
- Baeckea leptocalyx F.Muell.; Thryptomene leptocalyx (F.Muell.) F.Muell.

= Micromyrtus leptocalyx =

Species of shrub

Micromyrtus hexamera is a species of flowering plant in the myrtle family, Myrtaceae and is endemic to Queensland. It is a shrub with erect or spreading branchlets, overlapping linear leaves, and white flowers arranged singly in leaf axils with 5 stamens in each flower.

== Description ==
Micromyrtus hexamera is a shrub that typically grows up to 3 m (9.8 ft) high and has erect or spreading branchlets. Its leaves are overlapping, linear, 2.0–3.5 mm (0.079–0.138 in) long, 0.5–0.6 mm (0.020–0.024 in) wide and sessile or on a petiole up to 0.3 mm (0.012 in) long. The leaves are glabrous, have many oil glands, and the lower surface is keeled. The flowers are 4.5–5.0 mm (0.18–0.20 in) wide and arranged singly in leaf axils on a peduncle 1.0–1.5 mm (0.039–0.059 in) long, with 2 bracteoles about 0.7 mm (0.028 in) long at the base, but that fall off as the flowers open. There are 5 semicircular, translucent sepals lobes 0.5–0.8 mm (0.020–0.031 in) long, and 5 more or less round white petals 2.0–2.5 mm (0.079–0.098 in) in diameter. There are 5 stamens, the filaments about 0.3 mm (0.012 in) long. Flowering has been recorded in most months, with a peak around September.

== Taxonomy ==
This species was first formally described in 1858 by Ferdinand von Mueller who gave it the name Baeckea leptocalyx in his Fragmenta Phytographiae Australiae. In 1867, George Bentham transferred the species to the genus Micromyrtus as M. leptocalyx in his Flora Australiensis. The specific epithet (leptocalyx) means "slender sepals".

== Distribution and habitat ==
This species of micromyrtus grows in deeply weathered sandstone hills in central Queensland, mainly between Springsure and Tambo, but also near Alpha, Mitchell and Morven.
