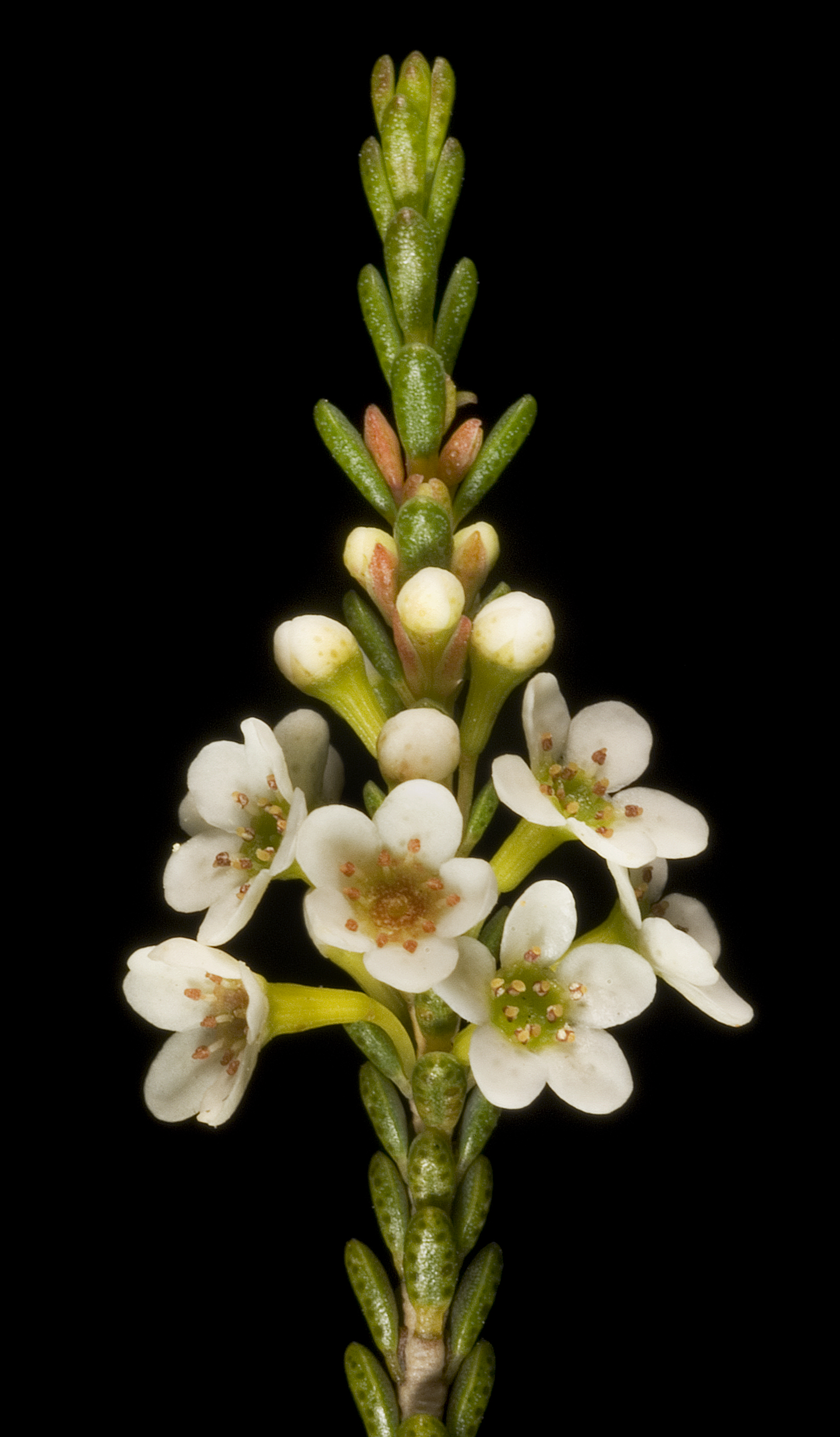

Scientific classification
- Kingdom: Plantae
- Clade: Tracheophytes
- Clade: Angiosperms
- Clade: Eudicots
- Clade: Rosids
- Order: Myrtales
- Family: Myrtaceae
- Genus: Micromyrtus
- Species: M. racemosa

Binomial name
- Micromyrtus racemosa Benth.

= Micromyrtus racemosa =

Species of shrub

Micromyrtus racemosa is species of the flowering plant in the family Myrtaceae and is endemic to the south-west of Western Australia. It is a shrub with relatively thick, narrowly egg-shaped leaves, sometimes with the narrower end toward the base, and white, cream-coloured or yellow flowers 2.5–4.0 mm (0.098–0.157 in) in diameter.

== Description ==
Micromyrtus racemosa is a shrub that typically grows to 0.7–3 m (2 ft 4 in – 9 ft 10 in) high and 0.1–1.5 m (3.9 in – 4 ft 11.1 in) wide and has erect leaves, sometimes almost pressed against the stems of smaller branchlets. Its leaves are narrowly egg-shaped, sometimes with the narrower end towards the base, 1.5–4.0 mm (0.059–0.157 in) long, 0.5–0.8 mm (0.020–0.031 in) wide and 0.3–0.4 mm (0.012–0.016 in) thick, on a petiole 0.3–0.6 mm (0.012–0.024 in) long. The flowers are 2.5–4.0 mm (0.098–0.157 in) in diameter, and arranged in between 4 and 20 upper leaf axils on a peduncle 1.3–3.0 mm (0.051–0.118 in) long. The sepals are 0.1–0.35 mm (0.0039–0.0138 in) long and 0.35–0.6 mm (0.014–0.024 in) wide and the petals are white or cream-coloured, rarely pink, 1.1–1.6 mm (0.043–0.063 in) long. The anthers are 0.30–0.35 mm (0.012–0.014 in) long and the style is 0.15–0.35 mm (0.0059–0.0138 in) wide. Flowering occurs between May and September and the fruit is 1.5–2 mm (0.059–0.079 in) long and about 0.7–1.0 mm (0.028–0.039 in) wide, containing a seed 1.4–1.8 mm (0.055–0.071 in) long.

== Taxonomy ==
Micromyrtus racemosa was first formally described in 1867 by George Bentham in his Flora Australiensis. The specific epithet (racemosa) means "racemose".

== Distribution and habitat ==
This species of micromyrtus grows in gravelly soils in rocky habitats, often in shrubland and occurs between the Mullewa, Kondinin and Parker Range areas in the Avon Wheatbelt, Coolgardie, Geraldton Sandplains, Mallee, Murchison and Yalgoo bioregions of south-western Western Australia.

== Conservation status ==
Micromyrtus racemosa is listed as "not threatened" by the Government of Western Australia Department of Biodiversity, Conservation and Attractions.
