= Micromyrtus uniovulum =

Conservation status
- Priority Two — Poorly Known Taxa (DEC)

Scientific classification
- Kingdom: Plantae
- Clade: Tracheophytes
- Clade: Angiosperms
- Clade: Eudicots
- Clade: Rosids
- Order: Myrtales
- Family: Myrtaceae
- Genus: Micromyrtus
- Species: M. uniovulum

Binomial name
- Micromyrtus uniovulum Rye

Species of shrub

Micromyrtus uniovulum is a species of flowering plant in the family Myrtaceae and is endemic to a small area in the south-west of Western Australia. It is a low, spreading, sometimes erect shrub with oblong leaves, and white flowers with 10 stamens.

== Description ==
Micromyrtus uniovulum is a low, spreading, sometimes erect shrub that typically grows to a height of up to 40 cm (16 in). Its leaves are narrowly to broadly oblong, 1.5–4.5 mm (0.059–0.177 in) long and 1–2 mm (0.039–0.079 in) wide on a petiole 0.3–0.5 mm (0.012–0.020 in) long usually with 5 to 8 oil glands on each side of the midvein. The flowers are arranged in racemes up to 30 upper leaf axils and are about 3 mm (0.12 in) in diameter on a peduncle 0.5–0.7 mm (0.020–0.028 in) long. The floral tube is 2.0–2.3 mm (0.079–0.091 in) long with 5 ribs. The sepals are 0.3–0.4 mm (0.012–0.016 in) long and 0.5–0.6 mm (0.020–0.024 in) wide. The petals are white, widely spreading and egg-shaped, and there are 10 stamens. Flowering occurs from September to December and the fruit is about 1.8 mm (0.071 in) long .

== Taxonomy ==
This species was first formally described in 2002 by Barbara Lynette Rye who gave it the name Micromyrtus uniovula in the journal Nuytsia from specimens collected near Bunny Road in 1999. In 1919, Alex George noted in the Australian Systematic Botany Newsletter, that the specific epithet is a noun, hence used in apposition, and should be uniovulum. In 2020, the epithet was corrected to uniovulum in the journal Nuytsia. The specific epithet (uniovulum) means 'one egg' and refers to the species having only one ovule in the ovary.

== Distribution and habitat ==
This species is found on the lateritic rises in a mall area west of Three Springs in the Avon Wheatbelt and Geraldton Sandplains bioregions of south-western Western Australia.

== Conservation status ==
Micromyrtus uniovulum is listed as "Priority Two" meaning that it is poorly known and known from only a few locations but is not under imminent threat.
