= Micromyrtus patula =

Scientific classification
- Kingdom: Plantae
- Clade: Tracheophytes
- Clade: Angiosperms
- Clade: Eudicots
- Clade: Rosids
- Order: Myrtales
- Family: Myrtaceae
- Genus: Micromyrtus
- Species: M. patula

Binomial name
- Micromyrtus patula A.R.Bean

Species of shrub

Micromyrtus patula is a species of flowering plant in the myrtle family, Myrtaceae and is endemic to a small area of south-eastern Queensland. It is a shrub with small, overlapping linear to lance-shaped leaves, and small white flowers arranged singly in leaf axils, usually with 5 stamens in each flower.

== Description ==
Micromyrtus patula is a shrub that typically grows to a height of up to 2 m (6 ft 7 in) and 2.5 m (8 ft 2 in) wide and has loose, grey bark. Its leaves are overlapping, linear to lance-shaped with the narrower end towards the base, 2.0–2.8 mm (0.079–0.110 in) long, 0.5–0.8 mm (0.020–0.031 in) wide and sessile. The leaves are glabrous and have prominent oil glands. The flowers are 2.2–2.6 mm (0.087–0.102 in) wide and arranged singly in leaf axils on a peduncle 0.5–0.7 mm (0.020–0.028 in) long, with 2 bracteoles 0.5–0.9 mm (0.020–0.035 in) long at the base. There are 5, rarely 6 sepals lobes are 0.1–0.2 mm (0.0039–0.0079 in) long, and the 5 or 6 white, more or less round petals are 0.3–0.5 mm (0.012–0.020 in) long. There are 5 stamens, the filaments 0.3–0.5 mm (0.012–0.020 in) long and the style is 0.3 mm (0.012 in) long. Flowering has been observed in March and September.

== Taxonomy ==
Micromyrtus patula was first formally described in 1997 by Anthony Bean in the journal Austrobaileya from specimens he collected in the Barakula State Forest, north-north-west of Chinchilla in 1994. The specific epithet (patula) means "open or "wide", alluding to the spreading habit of this species.

== Distribution and habitat ==
This species of micromyrtus is only known from the type location in the Barakula State Forest, where it grows in heath on a rocky sandstone platform.
