= Micromyrtus greeniana =

Conservation status
- Priority One — Poorly Known Taxa (DEC)

Scientific classification
- Kingdom: Plantae
- Clade: Tracheophytes
- Clade: Angiosperms
- Clade: Eudicots
- Clade: Rosids
- Order: Myrtales
- Family: Myrtaceae
- Genus: Micromyrtus
- Species: M. greeniana

Binomial name
- Micromyrtus greeniana Rye

Species of shrub

Micromyrtus greeniana is a species of flowering plant in the myrtle family, Myrtaceae and is endemic to a small area in the west of Western Australia. It is a spindly shrub with linear to egg-shaped leaves and small white or cream-coloured flowers.

== Description ==
Micromyrtus greeniana is a spindly shrub that typically grows to a height of 0.4–1.7 m (1 ft 4 in – 5 ft 7 in) with most of its leaves densely arranged on smaller side-branches. Its leaves are linear to egg-shaped with the narrower end towards the base, 5–6 mm (0.20–0.24 in) long and 0.5–0.8 mm (0.020–0.031 in) wide on a petiole 0.4–0.6 mm (0.016–0.024 in) long, with obscure oil glands. The flowers are 4.0–4.5 mm (0.16–0.18 in) in diameter, and arranged in 5 to 10 upper leaf axils on a peduncle 2.5–3 mm (0.098–0.118 in) long with narrowly egg-shaped bracteoles about 2 mm (0.079 in) long at the base. The sepals are broadly egg-shaped, 0.5–0.7 mm (0.020–0.028 in) long and 0.7–0.9 mm (0.028–0.035 in) wide. The petals are white or cream-coloured, 2.0–2.5 mm (0.079–0.098 in) long. Flowering occurs from August to October and the fruits are 2.5–2.7 mm (0.098–0.106 in) long and about 1 mm (0.039 in) wide.

== Taxonomy ==
Micromyrtus greeniana was first formally described in 2010 by Barbara Lynette Rye in the journal Nuytsia from specimens collected by Malcolm Eric Trudgen and Kevin Thiele on Eurardy Reserve in 2007. The specific epithet (greeniana) honours John William Green.

== Distribution and habitat ==
This species of micromyrtus grows is only known from a small area on Eurardy Reserve where it grows in yellow sand in mallee in the Geraldton Sandplains bioregion in the west of Western Australia.

== Conservation status ==
Micromyrtus greeniana is classified as "Priority One" by the Government of Western Australia Department of Biodiversity, Conservation and Attractions, meaning that it is poorly known and from only one or a few locations.
