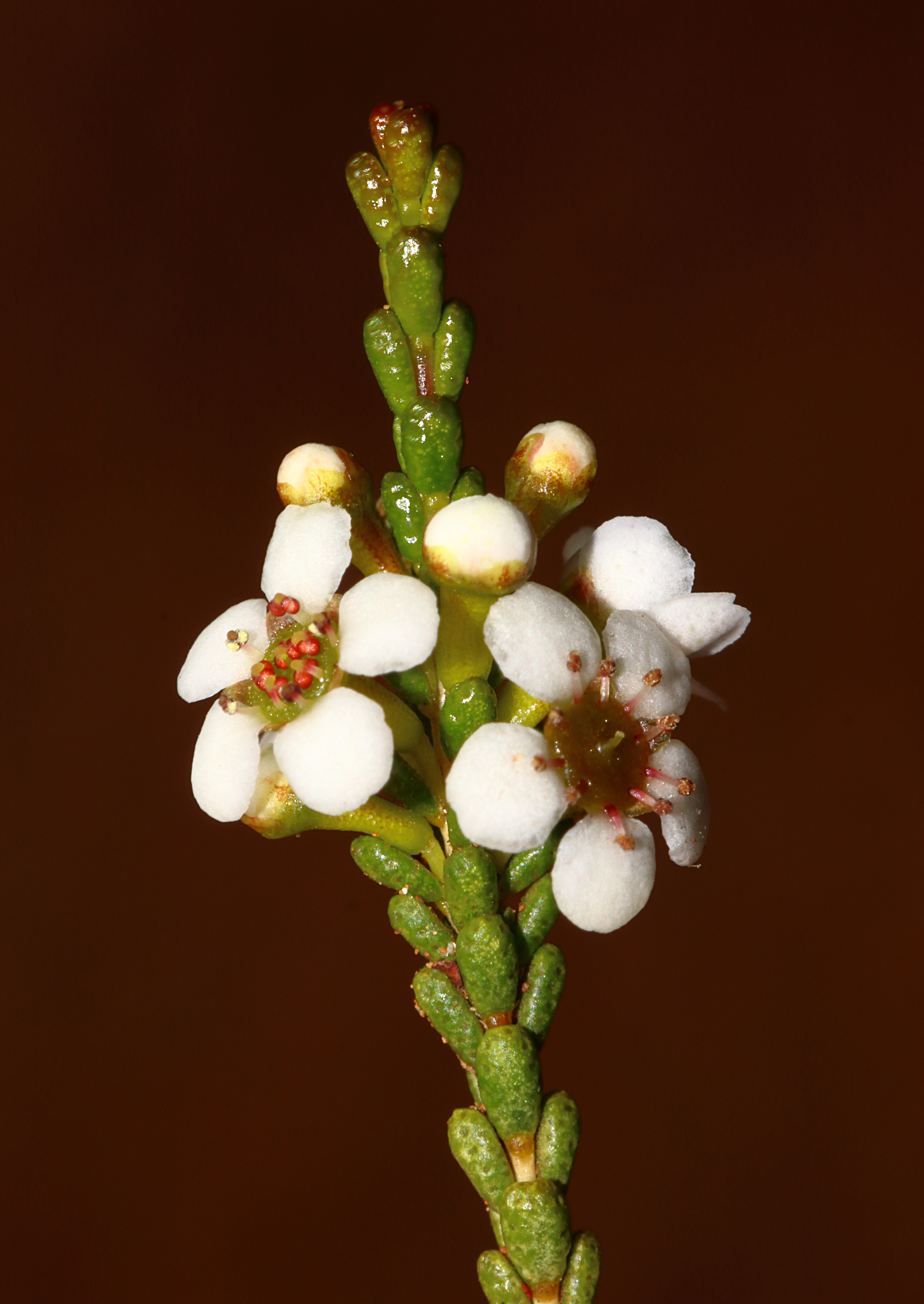
- Near Paynes Find

Scientific classification
- Kingdom: Plantae
- Clade: Tracheophytes
- Clade: Angiosperms
- Clade: Eudicots
- Clade: Rosids
- Order: Myrtales
- Family: Myrtaceae
- Genus: Micromyrtus
- Species: M. clavata

Binomial name
- Micromyrtus clavata J.W.Green exRye

= Micromyrtus clavata =

Species of shrub

Micromyrtus clavata is a species of flowering plant in the family Myrtaceae and is endemic to inland Western Australia. It is an erect, compact or sprawling shrub with erect, egg-shaped leaves with the narrower end towards the base and small white flowers arranged singly in upper leaf axils.

== Description ==
Micromyrtus clavata is an erect, compact or sprawling shrub that typically grows to a height of 0.3–1.8 m (1 ft 0 in – 5 ft 11 in). Its leaves are erect or almost pressed against the stem, mostly egg-shaped with the narrower end towards the base, 1.3–2.0 mm (0.051–0.079 in) long, 0.7–1 mm (0.028–0.039 in) wide on a petiole 0.2–0.3 mm (0.0079–0.0118 in) long. The flowers are arranged singly in up to 7 upper leaf axils on a peduncle 0.5–1.1 mm (0.020–0.043 in) long with bracteoles 0.5–0.7 mm (0.020–0.028 in) long at the base. The sepals are egg-shaped, 0.25–0.5 mm (0.0098–0.0197 in) long and the petals are white, 1.3–1.4 mm (0.051–0.055 in) long. There are ten stamens, the filaments 0.4–0.5 mm (0.016–0.020 in) long. Flowering occurs from June to September.

== Taxonomy ==
Micromyrtus clavata was first formally described in 2006 by Barbara Lynette Rye in the journal Nuytsia from an unpublished description by John Green of specimens collected 48 km (30 mi) south of Paynes Find in 1967. The specific epithet (clavata) means "club-shaped", referring to the leaves of this species.

== Distribution and habitat ==
This species grows in sandy soils, often on granite outcrops or on laterite, sometimes in winter-wet areas from near Paynes Find to near Leonora in the Avon Wheatbelt, Murchison and Yalgoo bioregions of inland Western Australia.
