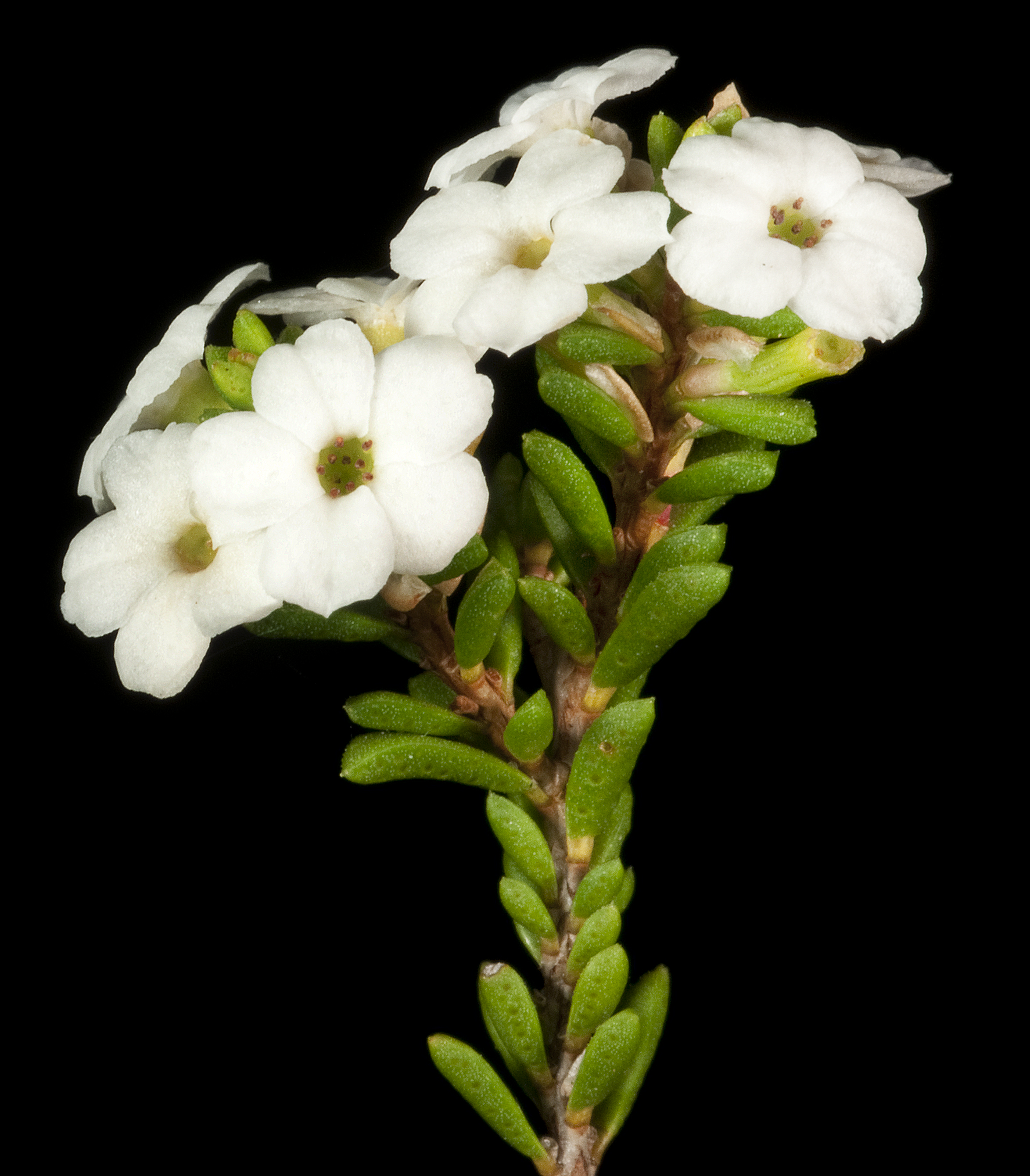

Scientific classification
- Kingdom: Plantae
- Clade: Tracheophytes
- Clade: Angiosperms
- Clade: Eudicots
- Clade: Rosids
- Order: Myrtales
- Family: Myrtaceae
- Genus: Micromyrtus
- Species: M. elobata

Binomial name
- Micromyrtus elobata (F.Muell.) Benth.

= Micromyrtus elobata =

Species of shrub

Micromyrtus elobata is a species of flowering plant in the myrtle family, Myrtaceae and is endemic to the south of Western Australia. It is usually an erect shrub with small, narrowly to broadly egg-shaped leaves with the narrower end towards the base, and white flowers 3–5 mm (0.12–0.20 in) in diameter.

== Description ==
Micromyrtus elobata is a usually erect shrub that typically grows to 0.1–1.5 m (3.9 in – 4 ft 11.1 in) high. Its leaves are narrowly to broadly egg-shaped with the narrower end towards the base, 1–6 mm (0.039–0.236 in) long and 0.8–1.5 mm (0.031–0.059 in) wide on a petiole 0.3–0.8 mm (0.012–0.031 in) long. The flowers are about 3–5 mm (0.12–0.20 in) in diameter, and arranged in up to 16 upper leaf axils on a peduncle 0.3–1.1 mm (0.012–0.043 in) long with egg-shaped bracteoles 1.5–2.8 mm (0.059–0.110 in) long at the base. The sepals are usually absent, and the petals are white, broadly egg-shaped with the narrower end towards the base and 1.5–2.5 mm (0.059–0.098 in) long. There are 10 stamens, the filaments about 0.2 mm (0.0079 in) long.

== Taxonomy ==
This species was first formally described in 1864 by Ferdinand von Mueller who gave it the name Thriptomene elobata in his Fragmenta Phytographiae Australiae from specimens collected by George Maxwell near Israelite Bay. In 1867, George Bentham transferred the species to the genus Micromyrtus as M. elobata in Flora Australiensis. The specific epithet (elobata) means "without lobes", referring to the sepals.

In 2006, Barbara Lynette Rye described two subspecies of M. elobata in the journal Nuytsia, and the names are accepted by the Australian Plant Census:

- Micromyrtus elobata (F.Muell) Benth. subsp. elobata has pointed leaves.
- Micromyrtus elobata subsp. scopula Rye has leaves with a protrusion near the end of the leaf.

== Distribution and habitat ==
Subspecies elobata occurs between Salmon Gums, the Fitzgerald River National Park and Israelite Bay in the Esperance Plains and Mallee bioregions, often in deep sand, commonly on low lying plains or on dunes. Subspecies scopula is found between Kumarl, south-west of Balladonia and Kau Rock in the Mallee bioregion.

== Conservation status ==
Micromyrtus elobata subsp. scopula is classified as "Priority Three" by the Government of Western Australia Department of Parks and Wildlife meaning that it is poorly known and known from only a few locations but is not under imminent threat.
