= Micromyrtus rotundifolia =

Scientific classification
- Kingdom: Plantae
- Clade: Tracheophytes
- Clade: Angiosperms
- Clade: Eudicots
- Clade: Rosids
- Order: Myrtales
- Family: Myrtaceae
- Genus: Micromyrtus
- Species: M. rotundifolia

Binomial name
- Micromyrtus rotundifolia A.R.Bean

Species of shrub

Micromyrtus rotundifolia is a species of flowering plant in the myrtle family, Myrtaceae and is endemic to a south-eastern Queensland. It is a shrub with more or less round leaves, and small white flowers arranged singly in leaf axils with 5 or 6 stamens in each flower.

== Description ==
Micromyrtus rotundifolia is a shrub that typically grows to a height of 0.4–2.5 m (1 ft 4 in – 8 ft 2 in) and 2.5 m (8 ft 2 in) wide. Unlike others in the genus, its leaves do not overlap, but are more or less round, 0.9–1.2 mm (0.035–0.047 in) long, 0.7–1.0 mm (0.028–0.039 in) wide and sessile. The leaves are glabrous with a few oil glands. The flowers are 2.5–3.5 mm (0.098–0.138 in) wide and arranged singly in leaf axils on a peduncle 0.5–1.5 mm (0.020–0.059 in) long, with 2 bracteoles 0.5–0.9 mm (0.020–0.035 in) long at the base. There are 5 or 6 sepals lobes 0.3 mm (0.012 in) long and 0.5–0.6 mm (0.020–0.024 in) wide, and 5 or 6 white, egg-shaped to more or less round petals 1.0–1.5 mm (0.039–0.059 in) long and wide. There are 5 or 6 stamens, the filaments 0.6–0.8 mm (0.024–0.031 in) long and the style is 0.4–0.5 mm (0.016–0.020 in) long. Flowering has been observed in February, August and September.

== Taxonomy ==
Micromyrtus rotundifolia was first formally described in 1997 by Anthony Bean in the journal Austrobaileya from specimens collected near Lake Buchanan. The specific epithet (rotundifolia) means "round leaf", alluding to the almost circular outline of the leaves.

== Distribution and habitat ==
This species of micromyrtus grows in shallow, sandy soils in shrubland or woodland on breakaways between Lake Buchanan and Alpha, although it is rare throughout its range.

== Conservation status ==
Micromyrtus rotundifolia is listed as "vulnerable" under the Queensland Government Nature Conservation Act 1992.
