= Micromyrtus chrysodema =

Conservation status
- Priority One — Poorly Known Taxa (DEC)

Scientific classification
- Kingdom: Plantae
- Clade: Tracheophytes
- Clade: Angiosperms
- Clade: Eudicots
- Clade: Rosids
- Order: Myrtales
- Family: Myrtaceae
- Genus: Micromyrtus
- Species: M. chrysodema

Binomial name
- Micromyrtus chrysodema Rye

Species of shrub

Micromyrtus chrysodema is a species of flowering plant in the myrtle family, Myrtaceae and is endemic to a small area of inland Western Australia. It is a densely branched shrub with small, narrowly oblong leaves and small white flowers.

== Description ==
Micromyrtus chrysodema is a densely branched shrub with narrowly oblong to egg-shaped leaves with the narrower end towards the base, about 1.6 mm (0.063 in) long and 0.6 mm (0.024 in) wide on a petiole 0.2–0.3 mm (0.0079–0.0118 in) long, with four to eight glands on each side of the mid-vein. The flowers are about 3.5–4.0 mm (0.14–0.16 in) in diameter, and arranged in up to four upper leaf axils on a peduncle 1.2–1.6 mm (0.047–0.063 in) long with narrowly egg-shaped bracteoles about 1.3 mm (0.051 in) long at the base. The sepals are egg-shaped, about 0.35 mm (0.014 in) long and the petals are white, round to egg-shaped and about 1.5 mm (0.059 in) long. There are five stamens, the filaments about 0.4 mm (0.016 in) long.

== Taxonomy ==
Micromyrtus chrysodema was first formally described in 2006 by Barbara Lynette Rye in the journal Nuytsia from specimens collected near Leinster in 2004. The specific epithet (chrysodema) means "gold district", referring to the distribution of this species in the Western Australian Goldfields.

== Distribution and habitat ==
This species of micromyrtus grows in scrubland with mulga and Triodia in the Leinster district of the Murchison bioregion of inland Western Australia.

== Conservation status ==
Micromyrtus chrysodema is classified as "Priority One" by the Government of Western Australia Department of Parks and Wildlife meaning that it is known from only one or a few locations that are potentially at risk.
