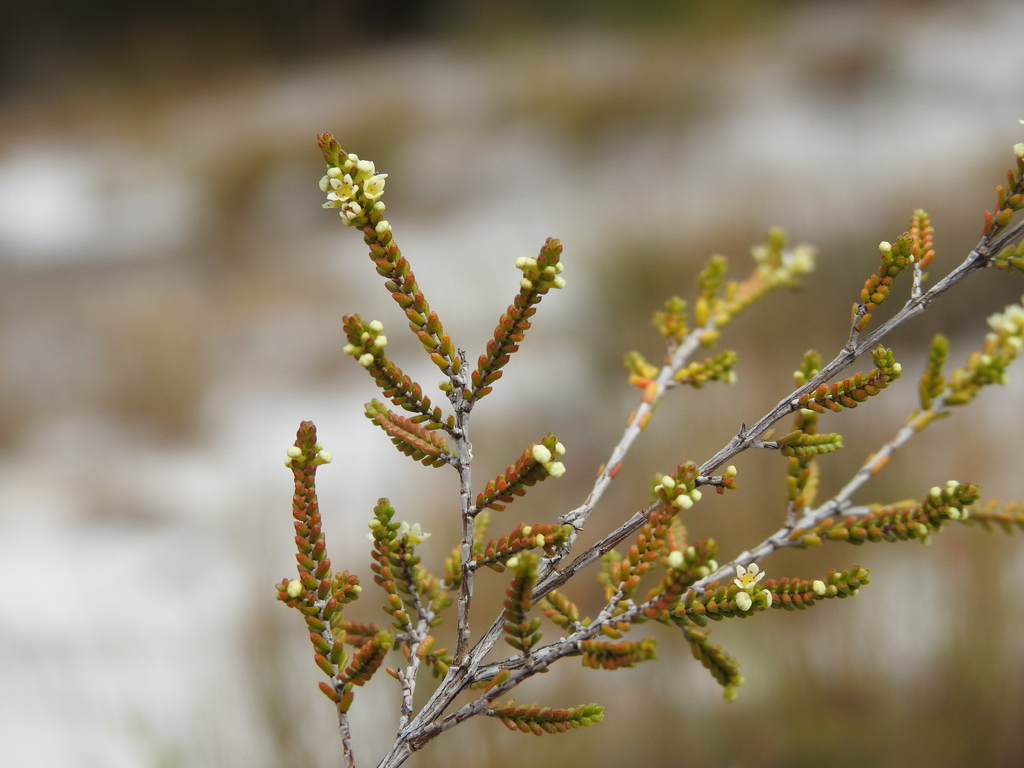
- Near Toogoom

Scientific classification
- Kingdom: Plantae
- Clade: Tracheophytes
- Clade: Angiosperms
- Clade: Eudicots
- Clade: Rosids
- Order: Myrtales
- Family: Myrtaceae
- Genus: Micromyrtus
- Species: M. littoralis

Binomial name
- Micromyrtus littoralis A.R.Bean

= Micromyrtus littoralis =

Species of shrub

Micromyrtus littoralis is a species of flowering plant in the myrtle family, Myrtaceae and is endemic to south-eastern Queensland. It is a shrub with small, overlapping egg-shaped to lance-shaped leaves, and small white flowers arranged singly in leaf axils with 5 stamens in each flower.

== Description ==
Micromyrtus littoralis is a shrub that typically grows to a height of 0.3–1.6 m (1 ft 0 in – 5 ft 3 in) and has grey bark. Its leaves are overlapping, egg-shaped to lance-shaped, 1.5–3 mm (0.059–0.118 in) long, 0.5–0.9 mm (0.020–0.035 in) wide and sessile or on a petiole up to 0.2 mm (0.0079 in) long. The leaves are glabrous, have prominent oil glands, and the lower surface is keeled. The flowers are 2.0–2.5 mm (0.079–0.098 in) wide and arranged singly in leaf axils on a peduncle 0.3–0.9 mm (0.012–0.035 in) long, with 2 bracteoles about 0.5 mm (0.020 in) long at the base, but that fall off as the flowers open. There are 5 sepals lobes 0.2–0.3 mm (0.0079–0.0118 in) long, and 5 elliptic white petals 0.8–1.0 mm (0.031–0.039 in) and 0.5–0.7 mm (0.020–0.028 in) wide. There are 5 stamens, the filaments 0.4–0.5 mm (0.016–0.020 in) long. Flowering has been recorded throughout the year.

== Taxonomy ==
Micromyrtus littoralis was first formally described in 1997 by Anthony Bean in the journal Austrobaileya from specimens collected halfway between Bundaberg and Childers by Stanley Thatcher Blake in 1963. The specific epithet (littoralis) means "pertaining to the sea-shore".

== Distribution and habitat ==
This species of micromyrtus grows in coastal wallum in Queensland, between Bundaberg and Cooloola National Park.
