= Micromyrtus imbricata =

Scientific classification
- Kingdom: Plantae
- Clade: Tracheophytes
- Clade: Angiosperms
- Clade: Eudicots
- Clade: Rosids
- Order: Myrtales
- Family: Myrtaceae
- Genus: Micromyrtus
- Species: M. imbricata

Binomial name
- Micromyrtus imbricata Benth.

Synonyms
- Thryptomene imbricata (Benth.) F.Muell.

Species of shrub

Micromyrtus imbricata is a species of the family Myrtaceae and is endemic to the south of Western Australia. It is a slender, erect shrub with broadly egg-shaped leaves, white, pink or red-tinged flowers 4–5 mm (0.16–0.20 in) in diameter, and 10 stamens.

== Description ==
Micromyrtus imbricata is a slender, erect shrub that typically grows to 0.2–1 m (7.9 in – 3 ft 3.4 in) high and is intricately branched. Its leaves are erect to almost pressed against the stem, broadly egg-shaped, 1.5–3 mm (0.059–0.118 in) long and 1.3–2 mm (0.051–0.079 in) wide on a petiole 0.4–0.6 mm (0.016–0.024 in) long. The flowers are 4–5 mm (0.16–0.20 in) in diameter, and arranged in up to 20 upper leaf axils on a peduncle 1.2–3 mm (0.047–0.118 in) long with narrowly egg-shaped bracteoles 0.6–2 mm (0.024–0.079 in) long but that fall off as the flower opens. The sepals are broadly egg-shaped, 0.5–0.8 mm (0.020–0.031 in) wide and often pink or tinged with red. The petals are white or sometimes pale pink at first, broadly egg-shaped with the narrower end towards the base and 1.5–2.3 mm (0.059–0.091 in) long. There are 10 stamens, the anthers about 0.3 mm (0.012 in) long. Flowering mainly occurs between August and November and the fruit is broadly cone-shaped, 1.1–1.4 mm (0.043–0.055 in) long and 1.0–1.3 mm (0.039–0.051 in) wide containing a single seed.

== Taxonomy ==
Micromyrtus imbricata was first formally described in 1867 by George Bentham in his Flora Australiensis from specimens collected by George Maxwell. The specific epithet (imbricata) means "overlapping".

== Distribution and habitat ==
This species grows on flats along the south coast of Western Australia in the Coolgardie, Esperance Plains and Mallee bioregions, where it grows in sandy soils over granite.
