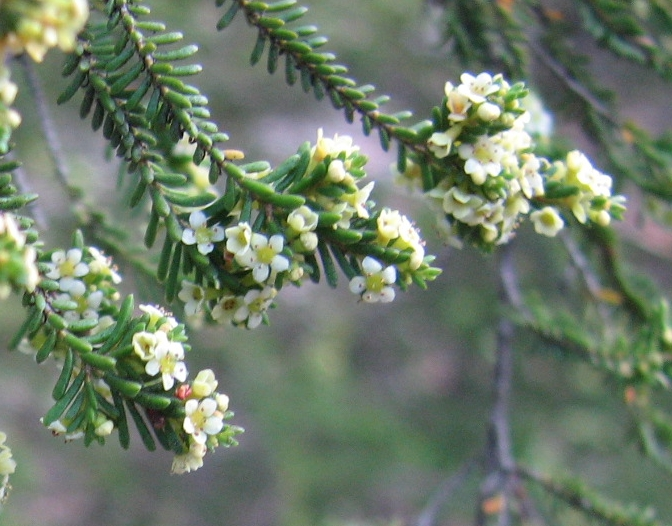
- Micromyrtus leptocalyx

Scientific classification
- Kingdom: Plantae
- Clade: Tracheophytes
- Clade: Angiosperms
- Clade: Eudicots
- Clade: Rosids
- Order: Myrtales
- Family: Myrtaceae
- Tribe: Chamelaucieae
- Genus: Micromyrtus; Benth.

Synonyms
- Thryptomene sect. Micromyrtus (Benth.) F.Muell.

= Micromyrtus =

Genus of shrubs

Micromyrtus is a genus of flowering plants in the family Myrtaceae and is endemic to Australia. Plants in the genus Micromyrtus are shrubs with simple leaves arranged in opposite pairs, and white, pink or yellow flowers arranged in upper leaf axils, the flowers with five sepals five petals and five or ten stamens.

== Description ==
Plants in the genus Micromyrtus are shrubs typically less than 1 m (3 ft 3 in) high. They have crowded, overlapping, simple leaves arranged in opposite pairs, oblong to lance-shaped and usually less than 3 mm (0.12 in) long. The flowers are arranged singly or in groups of up to three on a common peduncle, often forming clusters on the ends of branches. The flowers usually have five, (rarely six) small sepals and five (rarely six) white, pink or yellow, elliptic to round petals that are free from each other, and five or ten (rarely six or twelve) stamens. The fruit is a small, dry, indehiscent nut, usually containing a single seed.

== Taxonomy ==
The genus Micromyrtus was first formally described in 1865 by George Bentham in Genera Plantarum. The name Micromyrtus means "small myrtle".

=== Species list ===
The following names of species of Micromyrtus are accepted by Plants of the World Online and the Australian Plant Census as of August 2023:

- Micromyrtus acuta Rye (W.A.)
- Micromyrtus albicans A.R.Bean (Qld.)
- Micromyrtus arenicola Rye (W.A.)
- Micromyrtus barbata J.W.Green (W.A.)
- Micromyrtus blakelyi J.W.Green (N.S.W.)
- Micromyrtus capricornia A.R.Bean (Qld.)
- Micromyrtus carinata A.R. Bean (Qld.)
- Micromyrtus chrysodema Rye (W.A.)
- Micromyrtus ciliata (Sm.) Druce (N.S.W., A.C.T., Vic., S.A.) - fringed heath-myrtle
- Micromyrtus clavata J.W.Green ex Rye (W.A.)
- Micromyrtus collina Rye (W.A.)
- Micromyrtus delicata A.R.Bean (Qld.)
- Micromyrtus elobata (F.Muell.) Benth. (W.A.)
  - Micromyrtus elobata (F.Muell.) Benth. subsp. elobata
  - Micromyrtus elobata subsp. scopula Rye
- Micromyrtus erichsenii Hemsl. (W.A.)
- Micromyrtus fimbrisepala J.W.Green (W.A., S.A.)
- Micromyrtus flava (J.W.Green) Rye & Peter G.Wilson (W.A.)
- Micromyrtus flaviflora (F.Muell.) J.M.Black (W.A., N.T., S.A.)
- Micromyrtus forsteri A.R.Bean (Qld.)
- Micromyrtus gracilis A.R.Bean (Qld.)
- Micromyrtus grandis J.T.Hunter (N.S.W.)
- Micromyrtus greeniana Rye (W.A.)
- Micromyrtus helmsii (F.Muell. & Tate) J.W.Green (W.A.)
- Micromyrtus hexamera (Maiden & Betche) Maiden & Betche (Qld., N.S.W.)
- Micromyrtus hymenonema (F.Muell.) C.A.Gardner (W.A.)
- Micromyrtus imbricata Benth. (W.A.)
- Micromyrtus leptocalyx (F.Muell.) Benth. (Qld.)
- Micromyrtus littoralis A.R.Bean (Qld.)
- Micromyrtus minutiflora Benth. (N.S.W.)
- Micromyrtus monotaxis Rye (W.A.)
- Micromyrtus mucronulata Rye (W.A.)
- Micromyrtus navicularis Rye (W.A.)
- Micromyrtus ninghanensis Rye (W.A.)
- Micromyrtus obovata (Turcz.) J.W.Green (W.A.)
- Micromyrtus papillosa J.W.Green ex Rye (W.A.)
- Micromyrtus patula A.R.Bean (Qld.)
- Micromyrtus placoides Rye (W.A.)
- Micromyrtus prochytes Rye (W.A.)
- Micromyrtus racemosa Benth. (W.A.)
- Micromyrtus redita Rye (W.A.)
- Micromyrtus rogeri J.W.Green ex Rye (W.A.)
- Micromyrtus rotundifolia A.R.Bean (Qld.)
- Micromyrtus rubicalyx Rye (W.A.)
- Micromyrtus serrulata J.W.Green (W.A.)
- Micromyrtus sessilis J.W.Green (N.S.W., Qld.)
- Micromyrtus stenocalyx (F.Muell.) J.W.Green (W.A.)
- Micromyrtus striata J.W.Green (Qld., N.S.W.)
- Micromyrtus sulphurea W.Fitzg. (W.A.)
- Micromyrtus triptycha Rye (W.A.)
- Micromyrtus trudgenii Rye (W.A.)
- Micromyrtus uniovulum Rye (W.A.)
- Micromyrtus vernicosa A.R.Bean (Qld.)
