= Micromyrtus acuta =

Conservation status
- Priority Three — Poorly Known Taxa (DEC)

Scientific classification
- Kingdom: Plantae
- Clade: Tracheophytes
- Clade: Angiosperms
- Clade: Eudicots
- Clade: Rosids
- Order: Myrtales
- Family: Myrtaceae
- Genus: Micromyrtus
- Species: M. acuta

Binomial name
- Micromyrtus acuta Rye

Species of shrub

Micromyrtus acuta is a species of flowering plant in the myrtle family, Myrtaceae and is endemic to the southwest of Western Australia. It is an erect shrub with small, oblong leaves and small white flowers in the upper leaf axils.

== Description ==
Micromyrtus acuta is an erect shrub that typically grows to a height of 0.8–2 m (2 ft 7 in – 6 ft 7 in). It leaves are directed upwards, mostly arranged on the ends of branches, thick, blunt and oblong in outline, 1.5–1.8 mm (0.059–0.071 in) long and 0.6–0.8 mm (0.024–0.031 in) wide on a petiole 0.3–0.4 mm (0.012–0.016 in) long, with four to six prominent oil glands. The flowers are 4–5 mm (0.16–0.20 in) in diameter, and arranged in three to eight upper leaf axils on a peduncle 0.7–1.1 mm (0.028–0.043 in) long with narrowly egg-shaped bracteoles 1.1–1.4 mm (0.043–0.055 in) long at the base. The sepals are egg-shaped, 0.4–0.5 mm (0.016–0.020 in) long and the petals are white, elliptic to egg-shaped and 1.5–2.0 mm (0.059–0.079 in) long. There are ten stamens, the filaments 0.30–0.35 mm (0.012–0.014 in) long.

== Taxonomy ==
Micromyrtus acuta was first formally described in 2006 by Barbara Lynette Rye in the journal Nuytsia from specimens collected near Paynes Find in 1977. The specific epithet (acuta) means "sharply pointed", referring to the tips of the flower buds and sepals.

== Distribution and habitat ==
This species of micromyrtus grows in open shrubland from near Lake Monger to near Paynes Find in the Avon Wheatbelt and Yalgo bioregions of south-western Western Australia.

== Conservation status ==
Micromyrtus acuta is classified as "Priority Three" by the Government of Western Australia Department of Parks and Wildlife meaning that it is poorly known and known from only a few locations but is not under imminent threat.
