= Micromyrtus carinata =

Scientific classification
- Kingdom: Plantae
- Clade: Tracheophytes
- Clade: Angiosperms
- Clade: Eudicots
- Clade: Rosids
- Order: Myrtales
- Family: Myrtaceae
- Genus: Micromyrtus
- Species: M. carinata

Binomial name
- Micromyrtus carinata A.R.Bean

Species of shrub

Micromyrtus carinata is a species of flowering plant in the myrtle family, Myrtaceae and is endemic to a small area of south-eastern Queensland. It is a slender shrub with drooping branchlets, overlapping, egg-shaped to lance-shaped leaves and small white flowers arranged singly in leaf axils.

== Description ==
Micromyrtus carinata is a slender shrub that typically grows up to 2.5 m (8 ft 2 in) high and 0.5 m (1 ft 8 in) wide and has drooping branchlets. Its leaves overlap each other and are egg-shaped to lance-shaped with the narrower end towards the base, 1.1–1.5 mm (0.043–0.059 in) long, 0.5–0.7 mm (0.020–0.028 in) wide on a petiole about 0.25 mm (0.0098 in) long and have prominent oil glands. The flowers are arranged singly in leaf axils on a peduncle 0.5–1.3 mm (0.020–0.051 in) long, each flower 1.5–1.8 mm (0.059–0.071 in) wide. There are 2 white to pale green bracteoles about 0.5 mm (0.020 in) long at the base of the flower, but that fall off as the flowers open. The 5 sepals are joined but lack lobes. The 5 petals are white, more or less round and 0.8–1.0 mm (0.031–0.039 in) in diameter. There are five stamens, each opposite a petal, the filaments 0.3–0.4 mm (0.012–0.016 in) long. Flowering has been observed between May and October.

== Taxonomy ==
Micromyrtus carinata was first formally described in 1997 by Anthony Bean in the journal Austrobaileya from specimens collected near Gurulmundi in 1994. The specific epithet (carinata) means "keeled", referring to the petals.

== Distribution and habitat ==
This species of micromyrtus is only known from a small area north-west of Gurulmundi in south-eastern Queensland, where it grows in heath or woodland.
