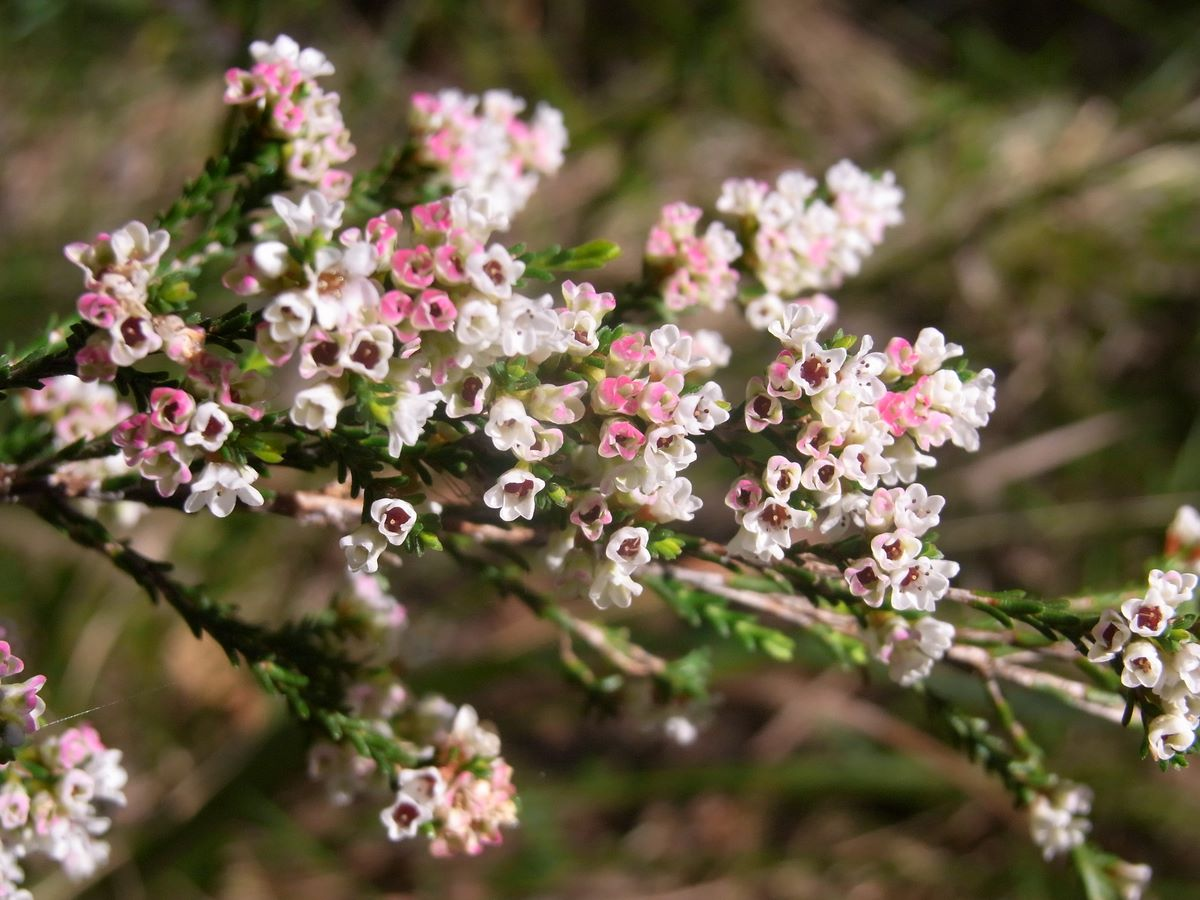

Scientific classification
- Kingdom: Plantae
- Clade: Tracheophytes
- Clade: Angiosperms
- Clade: Eudicots
- Clade: Rosids
- Order: Myrtales
- Family: Myrtaceae
- Genus: Micromyrtus
- Species: M. ciliata

Binomial name
- Micromyrtus ciliata (Sm.) Druce

= Micromyrtus ciliata =

Fringed heath-myrtle

Species of plant

Micromyrtus ciliata is a species of flowering plant in the family Myrtaceae and is endemic to south-eastern continental Australia. It is a spreading to erect shrub with crowded, oblong to egg-shaped leaves and small white or pink flowers arranged singly in upper leaf axils, forming clusters on the ends of branches.

== Description ==
Micromyrtus blakelyi is a spreading to erect shrub that typically grows to a height of 0.3–1.2 m (1 ft 0 in – 3 ft 11 in). Its leaves are crowded, oblong to egg-shaped with the narrower end towards the base, 1.5–4.0 mm (0.059–0.157 in) long, 0.5–1 mm (0.020–0.039 in) wide and more or less sessile. The flowers are more or less sessile, arranged singly in upper leaf axils, forming clusters near the ends of branches with bracteoles 2–5 mm (0.079–0.197 in) long at the base. The sepals are more or less round, up to 1 mm (0.039 in) long and the petals white or pink, broadly elliptic, 1.5–4 mm (0.059–0.157 in) long and 1–2 mm (0.039–0.079 in) wide. There are usually five stamens, the filaments 1.0–1.5 mm (0.039–0.059 in) long. Flowering mainly occurs from August to December.

== Taxonomy ==
This species was first formally described in 1797 by James Edward Smith who gave it the name Imbricaria ciliata in Transactions of the Linnean Society of London. In 1917, George Claridge Druce transferred the species to Micromyrtus as M. ciliata in The Botanical Exchange Club and Society of the British Isles Report for 1916.

== Distribution and habitat ==
Micromyrtus ciliata grows in a variety of habitats including mallee, forest and heath, often in rocky places. It is found in south-eastern and central New South Wales and the Australian Capital Territory south from Merriwa and the Hunter region, in the drier parts of inland Victoria, and in the far south-east of South Australia.
