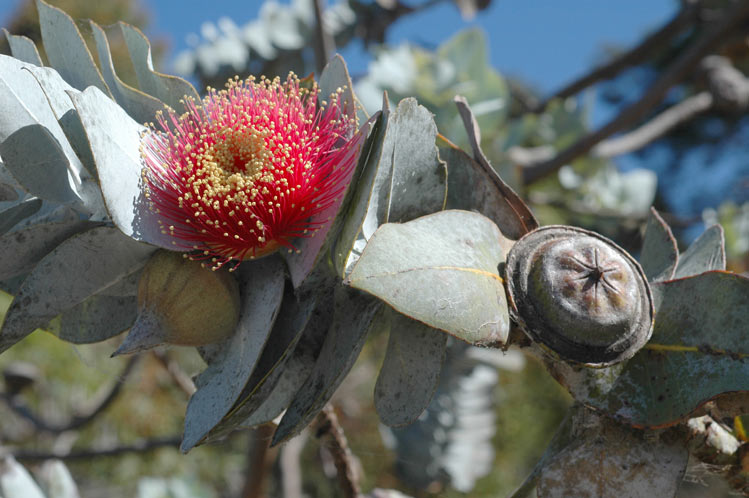
- Flower and fruit

Conservation status
- Endangered (IUCN 3.1)

Scientific classification
- Kingdom: Plantae
- Clade: Tracheophytes
- Clade: Angiosperms
- Clade: Eudicots
- Clade: Rosids
- Order: Myrtales
- Family: Myrtaceae
- Genus: Eucalyptus
- Species: E. rhodantha

Binomial name
- Eucalyptus rhodantha Blakely & H.Steedman
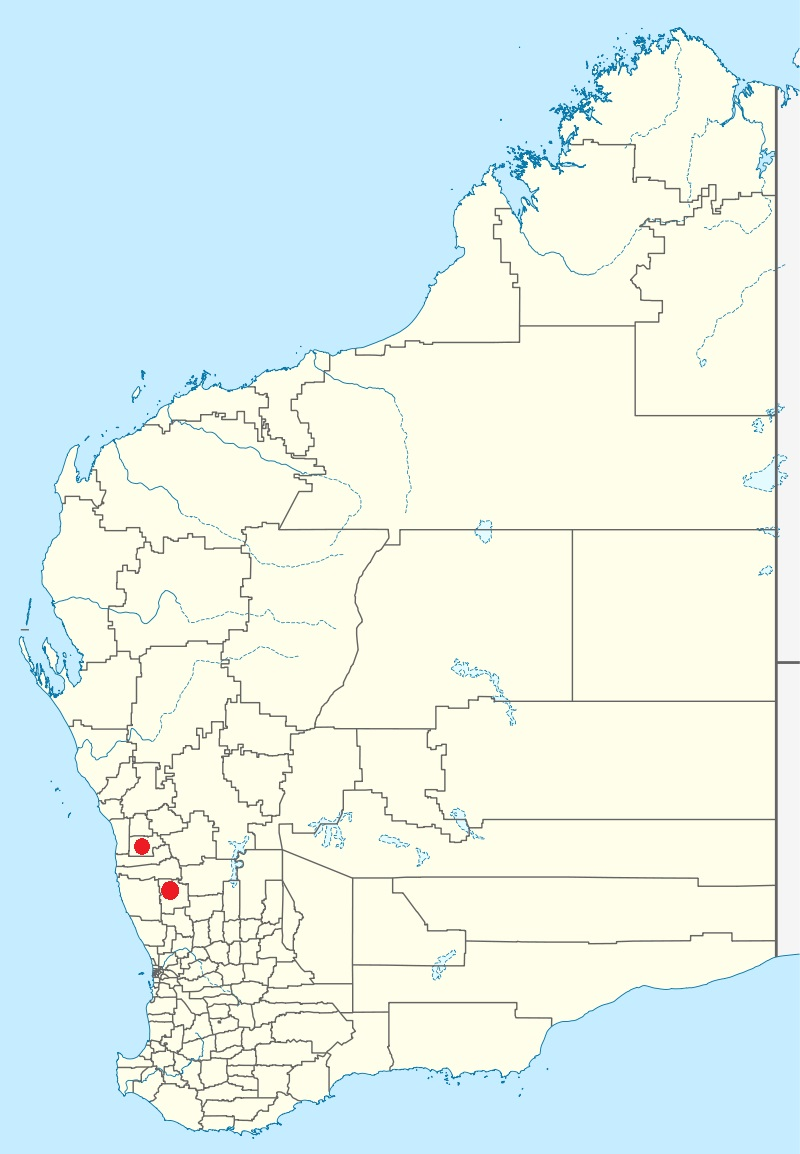
- Approximate native range of E. rhodantha

Synonyms
- Eucalyptus rhodantha var. petiolaris

= Eucalyptus rhodantha =

Rose mallee

Species of shrub from Western Australia

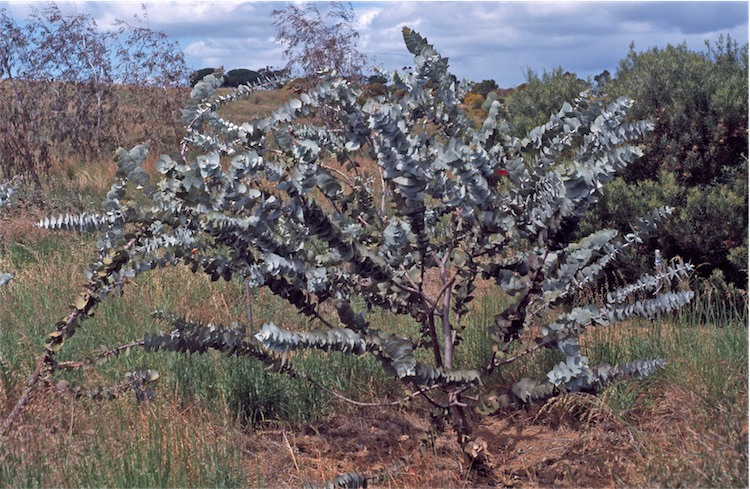
Cultivated specimen

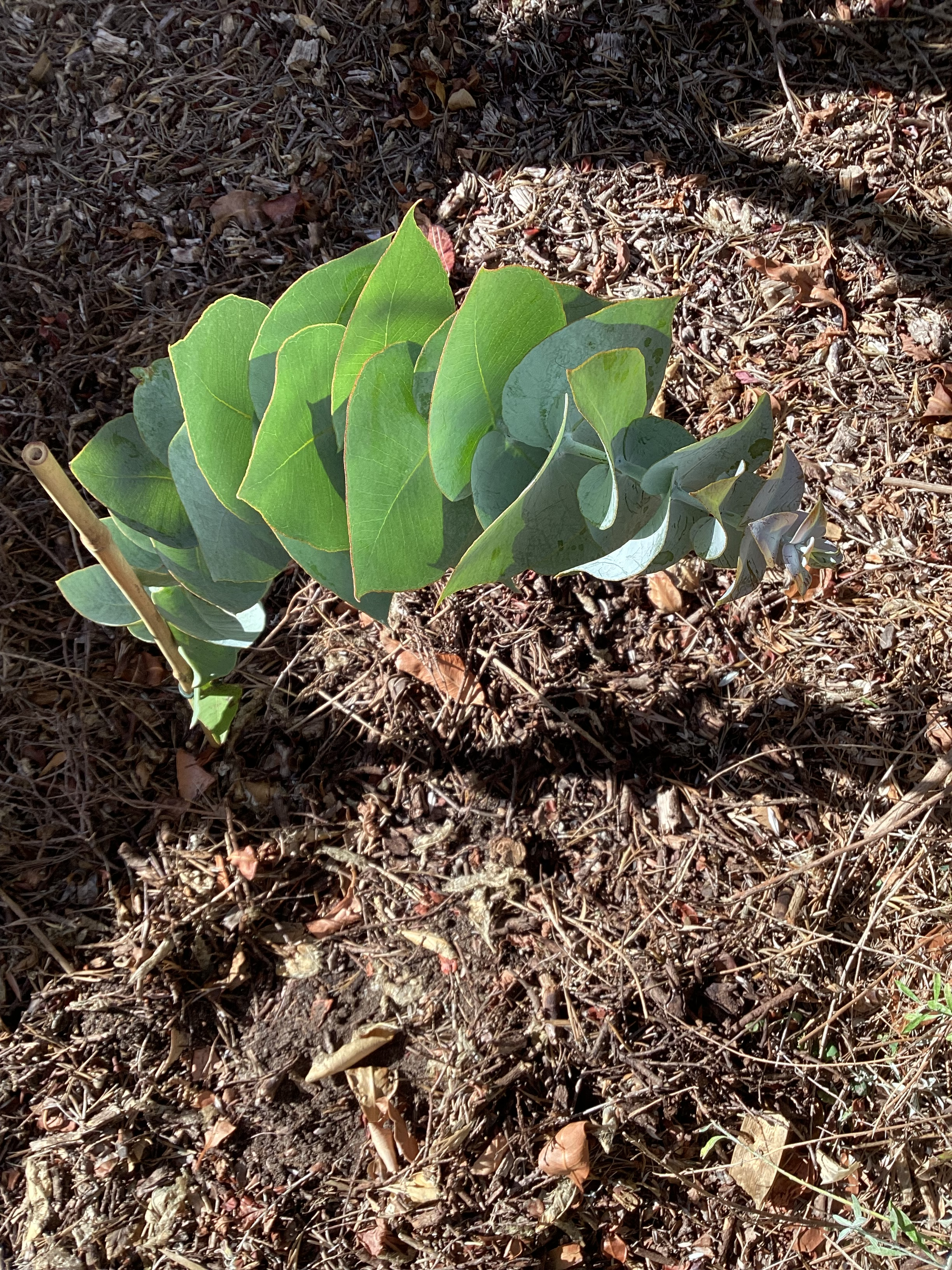
E. rhodantha sapling in a garden in Perth

Eucalyptus rhodantha, commonly known as rose mallee or rose gum, is a species of straggly mallee or shrub native to parts of Western Australia. It has smooth bark and a crown composed entirely of circular to heart-shaped juvenile leaves arranged in opposite pairs and attached directly to the stems with no stalks. The flower buds appear singly in the leaf axils and are red, the fruits hemispherical to conical and pendent. The rose mallee is grown as an ornamental shrub suitable for gardens in hot and dry climates. It is found more often in urban gardens and cultivation than in the wild and is readily available in seed form.

E. rhodantha was first formally described in 1938 by the Australian botanists and collectors William Blakely and Henry Steedman from material collected by Steedman near Gunyidi, Western Australia in 1934. As of December 2022, Plants of the World Online listed the formerly accepted Eucalyptus rhodantha var. petiolaris as a taxonomic synonym of E. rhodantha.

The species has a limited range in western parts of Western Australia and is known only from parts of the northern wheatbelt where a few remnant stands remain near Three Springs and Watheroo. It was given a vulnerable listing in 2000 by the Parliament of Australia's Environment Protection and Biodiversity Conservation Act 1999 (EPBC Act) and listed as endangered by the International Union for Conservation of Nature (IUCN) as of 2019.

== Description ==
Eucalyptus rhodantha is a straggly mallee or a shrub that typically grows to a height of 1.5–4 m (5–13 ft) and forms a lignotuber. As with all species of mallee the lignotuber is a swollen root crown that contains stores of starch as well as many dormant epicormic buds, allowing the plant to regenerate with new stems being produced from the lignotuber if the above ground portion of the plant is lost to drought, fire or physical forces. The main stems are typically 15 to 20 cm (6 to 8 in) diameter at the ground and the main branches have a diameter of 5 to 10 cm (2 to 4 in). The smooth bark on the stems is grey to greyish-brown and pinkish-grey. Smaller branchlets have a rounded cross-section. The stems branch from ground level from the lignotuber and spread outward to a width of about 3 m (10 ft) from the origin.

The leaf bearing portion of the plant, the crown, is composed entirely of juvenile leaves that are sessile, lacking a stalk and attached directly to the stem. They are arranged in opposite pairs and their bases surround the stem. The leaves are dull silver-grey or glaucous on both sides, circular to heart-shaped, 45–90 mm (1.8–3.5 in) long and 30–75 mm (1.2–3.0 in) wide. The mature leaves also are opposite and sessile, circular to heart-shaped and sometimes acuminate (tapered to a long point). They are moderately thick with a leathery texture and are 50–100 mm (2.0–3.9 in) long and 40–90 mm (1.6–3.5 in) wide. They have distinct veins with many thin and irregular lateral veins running off the more prominent midrib at angles of 50° to 65°. The leaves have few oil glands and have dense reticulation with intramarginal veins (veins separated from the margin).

The flower buds are arranged singly in leaf axils on a long and thick down-turned peduncle of length 10–35 mm (0.39–1.38 in), with a pedicel of length 8–20 mm (0.31–0.79 in). The large flowers can be up to 7.5 cm (3.0 in) in diameter and pink to bright red, or occasionally yellow and rarely creamy-white. Flowering occurs from July or September to December or January and has been noted as late as February. Mature buds are egg-shaped, glaucous, frequently finely ribbed, 28–53 mm (1.1–2.1 in) long and 23–37 mm (0.91–1.46 in) wide with a beaked operculum 20–32 mm (0.79–1.26 in) long. The stamens all curve inward and have obovate to cube-shaped yellow anthers attached along the backs of the filaments. These anthers gape open to release pollen by longitudinal slits. The numerous filaments are sub-compressed into many rows and are a crimson or dark rose-red to pink. The style is long and linear while the stigma is more tapered with four or five cavities leading to the ovary. Ten rows of vertically arranged ovules are found within the ovary.

The pendent fruit is a woody, down-turned, hemispherical to conical capsule ranging in length between 16 and 28 mm (0.63 and 1.10 in) and width 33 to 45 mm (1.3 to 1.8 in) with protruding valves and a single, pale, semi-conical disc fused to the base of the exserted (projecting) valves. The woody fruits are shaped like spinning tops and contain winged grey-brown to dark brown to black seeds. The fertile seeds have an obliquely pyramidal shape and have three to four radiating ridges extending to a wing-shape. Less fertile seeds tend have a more linear shape and are red-brown.

Plants in the vicinity of Three Springs have darker and greener leaves. E. rhodantha is related to and resembles Eucalyptus macrocarpa but is a more compact plant with shorter leaves and smaller hanging buds and fruits. E. rhodantha also has leaves that are shorter or less elongated. Both E. rhodantha and E. macrocarpa belong to the series Curviptera and they usually are not found growing together.

== Taxonomy and naming ==
Eucalyptus rhodantha was first formally described in 1938 by the Australian botanists and collectors William Blakely and Henry Steedman in Proceedings of the Linnean Society of New South Wales from material collected by Steedman near Gunyidi in 1934. The holotype is held at Royal Botanic Gardens, Kew. Further specimens were collected by Keith Maxwell Allan from 15.8 km (9.8 mi) southwest of Three Springs and are stored at herbariums in Perth and Melbourne. Others were collected by George Chippendale from 13.4 km (8.3 mi) south of Gunyidi siding, and are stored in Perth, Sydney and Melbourne.

The specific epithet (rhodantha) is from ancient Greek, meaning "rose coloured" and "-flowered".

=== Varieties ===
In 1941, Blakely described Eucalyptus rhodantha var. × petiolaris in The Australian Naturalist (the journal of the Naturalists' Society of New South Wales) and its name, and that of the autonym, are accepted by the Australian Plant Census:

- Eucalyptus rhodantha var. × petiolaris Blakely
- Eucalyptus rhodantha var. rhodantha

Blakely initially gave the name Eucalyptus rhodantha var. petiolaris, as of 2015 considered to be a hybrid between E. rhodantha and E. pyriformis and named Eucalyptus rhodantha var. × petiolaris.

As of December 2022, Plants of the World Online listed Eucalyptus rhodantha var. petiolaris as a synonym of E. rhodantha.

=== Classification ===
Eucalyptus rhodantha is included in subgenus Symphyomyrtus and the section Bisectae and the Destitutae subsection. Members of this subsection have buds with two opercula and branchlets where the pith is lacking in oil glands. E. rhodantha is also included in series Curviptera within the subsection. This series includes approximately thirty species and subspecies that are closely related, with large fruit, most often with an ascending disc and valves that project beyond the disc, and several species have large-leaved crowns composed of juvenile leaves.

== Distribution and habitat ==
Eucalyptus rhodantha is native to Western Australia and is found in the Avon Wheatbelt and Geraldton Sandplains bioregions. The plant is only known from the northern wheatbelt where a few remnant stands remain near Three Springs and Watheroo. Several reports have identified the range extending south to Bolgart and New Norcia; these appear to be hybrid progeny of E. macrocarpa and E. pyriformis. All the specimens of E. rhodantha collected are from the Watheroo and Three Springs locations with the exception of one plant recorded from Eneabba Creek in 1953. Eneabba Creek and nearby areas were observed in August 1991 but no further populations were found. Since that time, the bulk of the native flora has been cleared for agricultural purposes. In the vicinity of Watheroo two moderately undisturbed populations of E. rhodantha are situated on private land that remains uncleared. The rest are found on vacant land, farmland used for grazing livestock and degraded borders along roads.

Eucalyptus rhodantha grows in flat or slightly hilly country, on sandy or gravelly soils as a part of shrubby heathland communities on yellow sandplains. Other Eucalyptus species found in the same area as E. rhodantha include York gum (E. loxophleba), malallie (E. eudesmioides) and blackbutt (E. todtiana). Additional floral species of this habitat include Hakea trifurcata, Dryandra ashbyi, Grevillea eriostachya, Calothamnus quadrifidus as well as various species of Acacia. The climate of this area has similarities to a Mediterranean climate but drier; most rainfall occurs from May to August. The winters are cool and there are hot summers, and frosts are rare. Average yearly rainfall is 388 mm (15.3 in) at Three Springs and 425 mm (16.7 in) at Watheroo.

== Ecology ==
Flowering takes place between March and November, peaking in winter from June to August. It produces only a few flowers per plant compared to other species of eucalypt. Individual plants differ in time and length of time of flowering as well as the quantity of flowers produced. The long-lived flowers have a lifespan of 20–30 days and produce large amounts of nectar during the day. The species is protandrous, with the male reproductive organs maturing prior to the female. The male anthers spill pollen within six or seven days of anthesis, and the female stigma is not receptive to pollen until about twelve days.

=== Pollinators ===
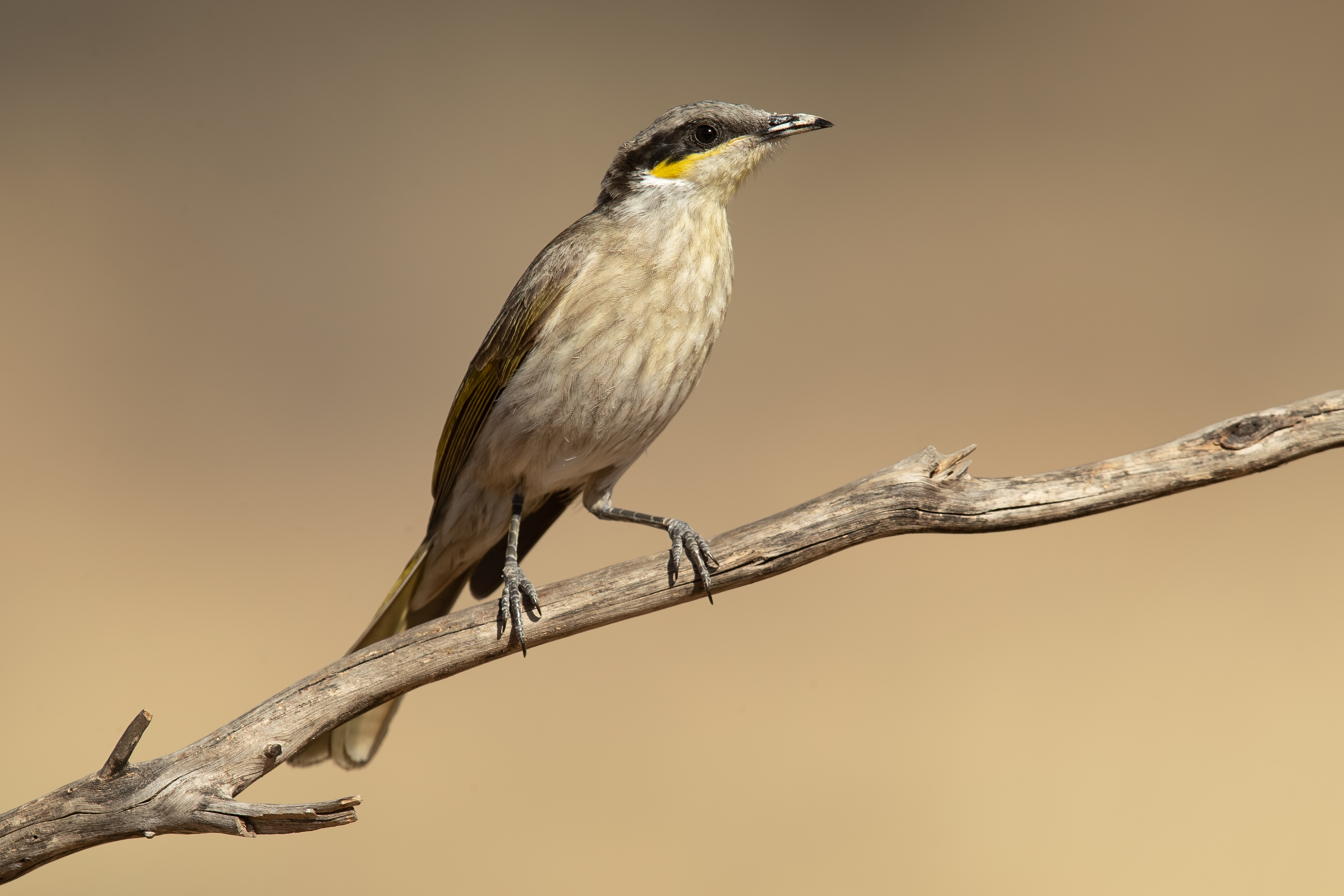
Singing honeyeater

The flowers of Eucalyptus rhodantha are pollinated by a host of birds including the white-fronted honeyeater (Phildonyris albifrons), singing honeyeater (Lichenostomus virescens), brown honeyeater (Lichmera indistincta), red wattlebird (Anthochaera carunculata), yellow-throated miner (Manorina flavigula) and Australian ringneck (Barnardius zonarius). The yellow-throated miner and the singing honeyeater are thought to contribute the most to pollination. The birds do not exclusively forage on E. rhodantha, as they also are known to feed on other local species including Banksia ashbyi, Banksia prionotes, Calothamnus quadrifidus and Grevillea eriostachya. The number and behaviour of birds varies between seasons and the birds fly long distances between different flowers. The larger honeyeaters are especially well-suited to pollination as they are able to collect the nectar and pollen easily and deposit it on the stigma efficiency. It is thought that the larger flowers of E. rhodantha are indicative of the development of a system of reproduction that encourages pollination by birds which can carry pollen over larger distances instead of insects which have a smaller range.

Tarsipes rostratus, commonly known as the honey possum, is the only mammal thought to act as a pollinator.

=== Destructors ===
New shoots and buds grow over the summer months, and bud weevils (Haplonyx maximus) and Australian ringnecks (Barnardius zonarius) consume them thereby reducing the number that flower. Sheep are able to browse on E. rhodantha and can strip new growth from juvenile plants.

=== Diseases ===
E. rhodantha is thought to be susceptible to Phytophthora root-rot or die-back, the fungus that causes die-back which affects other plant species in the environment that support pollinators of E. rhodantha.

=== Reproduction ===
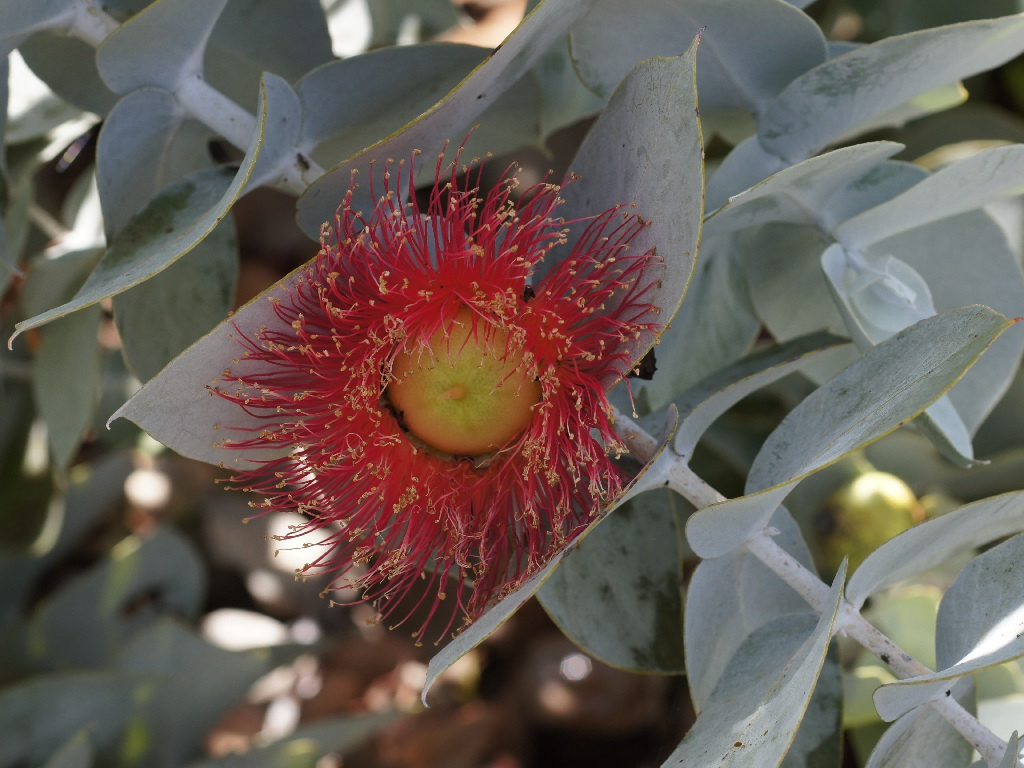
Flower detail

Eucalyptus rhodantha has a mixed mating system; it reproduces mainly by outcrossing but is able to self-pollinate. Protandry is achieved by the plant shedding the bulk of the pollen from the anthers within a week following the flower opening and then the stigma becoming receptive at around twelve days. This does not stop self-pollination in E. rhodantha because plants can have flowers in different stages at the same time. Single plants in remote settings have been found with seed, indicating that self-pollination occurs in E. rhodantha. Inbreeding other than through self-pollination also can occur, most likely the result of mating between closely related plants.

The mixed mating system of E. rhodantha is thought to be the result of outcrossing, which favours heterozygous offspring. Selection pressures throughout the species' life cycle appear to favour heterozygosity, which has a significantly higher incidence in mature plants than in seeds or seedlings. It is thought that the higher survival rate is due to selection operating over the entirety of the life cycle and the heterozygous offspring survive more often in all periods of the cycle

== Conservation ==
Rose mallee has been listed as vulnerable since 2017 according to the Parliament of Australia's Environment Protection and Biodiversity Conservation Act 1999 (EPBC Act) and a recovery plan has been prepared. The Western Australian Government lists the species as Threatened under the Biodiversity Conservation Act 2016, meaning that it is in danger of extinction. The fragmented distribution of E. rhodantha within agricultural regions is a key factor that jeopardises the species' long-term survival in the wild. Only two of the extant stands are in uncleared areas, the rest occurring on cleared land or along weedy verges. No natural increase in numbers of plants, totalling fewer than 1000 mature individuals, has been observed since the populations have been monitored. It is believed that inbreeding has resulted in weaker plants with reduced reproductive capacity. Although unauthorised seed collection from roadside plants has occurred in the past, this practice is now less common. Spray drift resulting from pesticide and herbicide application to nearby crops may have a deleterious effect. Soil-borne problems, including salinity and root-rot fungus (Phytophthora cinnamomi), may become an increasing threat in the future.

Conservation efforts have involved consultation among local government, state authorities and landowners. In 1995 an area of private land containing the largest discrete population of E. rhodantha var. rhodantha was purchased and is now a nature reserve. Collaborative research involving the University of Western Australia, Curtin University and the Department of Conservation and Land Management has been undertaken to investigate the species' genetic makeup and reproductive biology. Promotion of the widespread cultivation of the species in Australia is seen to be beneficial to the conservation effort.

Eucalyptus rhodantha var. rhodantha is listed as Threatened Flora (Declared Rare Flora — Extant) under Western Australia's Wildlife Conservation Act 1950 and as vulnerable under the EPBC Act.

In 2000, E. rhodantha var. × petiolaris was determined to be a hybrid of E. rhodantha var. rhodantha and E. pyriformis and is therefore ineligible to be listed under the EPBC Act. It is categorised as Priority Four by the Government of Western Australia Department of Biodiversity, Conservation and Attractions, meaning that it is rare or near threatened.

E. rhodantha was listed as Endangered (EN) by the International Union for Conservation of Nature (IUCN) as of 2019. The estimated population at that time was 704 mature plants spread over an area of 36 km^{2} (14 sq mi). The population was described as stable and known to occur mostly in two separate locations with 23 individuals in the southern location and 681 in a northern location.

== Uses ==
Rose mallee is grown as an ornamental shrub. It is found more often in urban gardens and cultivation than in the wild. It will grow well in full sun and well-drained sandy soils and juvenile plants need protection from frost. The spreading evergreen is suitable for drought-resistant, low-maintenance gardens as a feature plant, windbreak or screening plant. It is used for erosion control and attracts nectar-eating birds, bees, butterflies and other insects.

Eucalyptus rhodantha is widely available and can be easily grown from seed. It prefers an open position in full sun and is suited to most soils other than those containing lime. Plants may be cultivated in Sydney, despite the significant difference in climatic conditions from their original habitat.

Eucalypts are culturally important to Aboriginal Australians for many uses and meanings.

== See also ==
- List of Eucalyptus species
