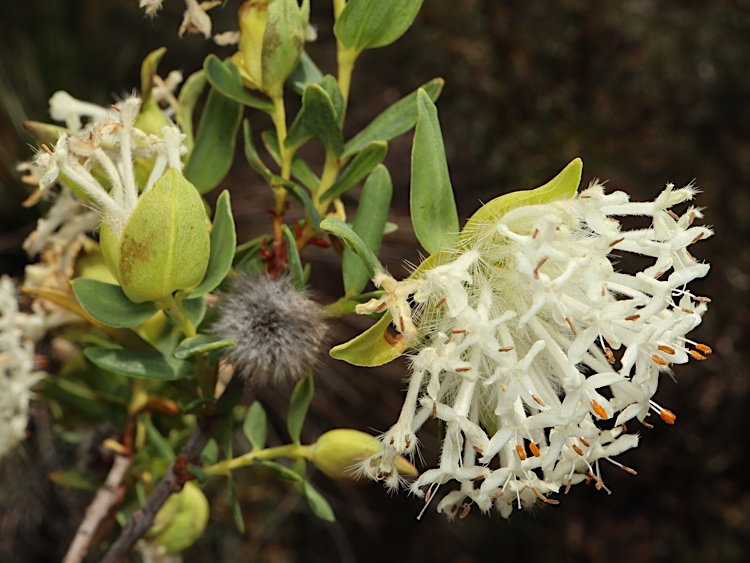
- Near Cataby

Scientific classification
- Kingdom: Plantae
- Clade: Tracheophytes
- Clade: Angiosperms
- Clade: Eudicots
- Clade: Rosids
- Order: Malvales
- Family: Thymelaeaceae
- Genus: Pimelea
- Species: P. leucantha

Binomial name
- Pimelea leucantha Diels

Synonyms
- Pimelea rosea var. calocephala Meisn.

= Pimelea leucantha =

Species of shrub

Pimelea leucantha is a species of flowering plant in the family Thymelaeaceae and is endemic to near-coastal areas in the west of Western Australia. It is a shrub with linear to narrowly egg-shaped or narrowly elliptic leaves and clusters of white to pale yellow flowers surrounded by 4 or 6 egg-shaped involucral bracts.

== Description ==
Pimelea leucantha is an erect shrub that typically grows to a height of 0.4–2 m (1 ft 4 in – 6 ft 7 in) and has a single stem at ground level. The leaves are mostly linear to narrowly egg-shaped or narrowly elliptic, 12–28 mm (0.47–1.10 in) long and 1–5 mm (0.039–0.197 in) wide on a petiole 0.5–1.2 mm (0.020–0.047 in) long. The flowers are white to pale yellow and arranged in clusters on a peduncle 1–6 mm (0.039–0.236 in) long. There are 4 or 6 pale yellowish green, often pink-tinged, egg-shaped involucral bracts 14–24 mm (0.55–0.94 in) long and 6–14 mm (0.24–0.55 in) wide around the flower clusters, each flower on a hairy pedicel 1.0–1.5 mm (0.039–0.059 in) long. The sepals are 3.0–5.5 mm (0.12–0.22 in) long, the narrow section of the floral tube 9–14 mm (0.35–0.55 in) long, and the stamens usually shorter than the sepals. Flowering occurs from August to early November.

== Taxonomy ==
Pimelea leucantha was first formally described in 1904 by Ludwig Diels in Botanische Jahrbücher für Systematik, Pflanzengeschichte und Pflanzengeographie. The specific epithet (leucantha) means "white-flowered".

== Distribution and habitat ==
This pimelea grows in deep sand, or in sand over rock mainly in jarrah or Banksia woodland in near coastal areas of Western Australia, from Tamala Station near Kalbarri to Nine Mile Lake Nature Reserve near Pinjarra, and extending inland as far as Three Springs, in the Avon Wheatbelt, Geraldton Sandplains, Swan Coastal Plain and Yalgoo bioregions.

== Conservation status ==
Pimelea leucantha is listed as "not threatened" by the Government of Western Australia Department of Biodiversity, Conservation and Attractions.
