= Babingtonia delicata =

Conservation status
- Priority One — Poorly Known Taxa (DEC)

Scientific classification
- Kingdom: Plantae
- Clade: Tracheophytes
- Clade: Angiosperms
- Clade: Eudicots
- Clade: Rosids
- Order: Myrtales
- Family: Myrtaceae
- Genus: Babingtonia
- Species: B. delicata

Binomial name
- Babingtonia delicata Rye & Trudgen

Species of flowering plant

Babingtonia delicata is a species of flowering plant in the family Myrtaceae and is endemic to a small area in the southwest of Western Australia. It is a slender shrub with erect stems, linear leaves and bright pink flowers in groups of up to three, each flower with 4 to 8 stamens.

== Description ==
Babingtonia delicata is a shrub that typically grows to a height of 30–80 cm (12–31 in), and has slender, erect stems. The leaves are sometimes densely clustered, linear, 5–11 mm (0.20–0.43 in) long and 0.5–0.8 mm (0.020–0.031 in) wide on a petiole 0.4–0.7 mm (0.016–0.028 in) long. The flowers are arranged in groups of up to three on a peduncle 1.0–2.2 mm (0.039–0.087 in) long, each flower on a pedicel up to 0.5 mm (0.020 in) long. The sepals are about 0.4 mm (0.016 in) long and 0.7–1 mm (0.028–0.039 in) wide and the petals are bright pink, 1.4–1.8 mm (0.055–0.071 in) long. There are 4 to 8 stamens in each flower. The ovary has a single locule and the style is 0.5–0.7 mm (0.020–0.028 in) long. Flowering occurs in November and December, and the fruit is a capsule 1.4–1.5 mm (0.055–0.059 in) long and 1.3–1.4 mm (0.051–0.055 in) wide.

== Taxonomy ==
Babingtonia delicata was first formally described in 2015 by Barbara Rye and Malcolm Trudgen in the journal Nuytsia from specimens collected near Cataby in 2004. The specific epithet (delicata) means "dainty", referring to the form of the plant and its small, attractive flowers.

== Distribution and habitat ==
This species mostly grows in sandy soils in low-lying, winter-wet areas near Cataby, in the Geraldton Sandplains and Swan Coastal Plain biogeographic regions of south-western Western Australia.

== Conservation status ==
Babingtonia delicata is listed as "Priority one" by the Western Australian Government Department of Biodiversity, Conservation and Attractions, meaning that it is known from only one or a few locations that are potentially at risk.
