= Leioproctus baeckeae =

Scientific classification
- Kingdom: Animalia
- Phylum: Arthropoda
- Clade: Pancrustacea
- Class: Insecta
- Order: Hymenoptera
- Family: Colletidae
- Genus: Leioproctus
- Species: L. baeckeae

Binomial name
- Leioproctus baeckeae (Rayment, 1948)

Synonyms
- Euryglossa baeckeae Rayment, 1948

Species of bee

Leioproctus baeckeae, or Leioproctus (Euryglossidia) baeckeae, is a species of bee in the family Colletidae and subfamily Colletinae. It is endemic to Australia. It was described by Australian entomologist Tarlton Rayment in 1948.

== Description ==
Male body length about 5 mm. Integumental colouration mainly green with a metallic lustre; hair white.

== Distribution and habitat ==
The species occurs in Western Australia. The type locality is Bolgart.

== Behaviour ==
The adults are flying mellivores. Flowering plants visited by the bees include Babingtonia camphorosmae as well as Grevillea and Hakea species.

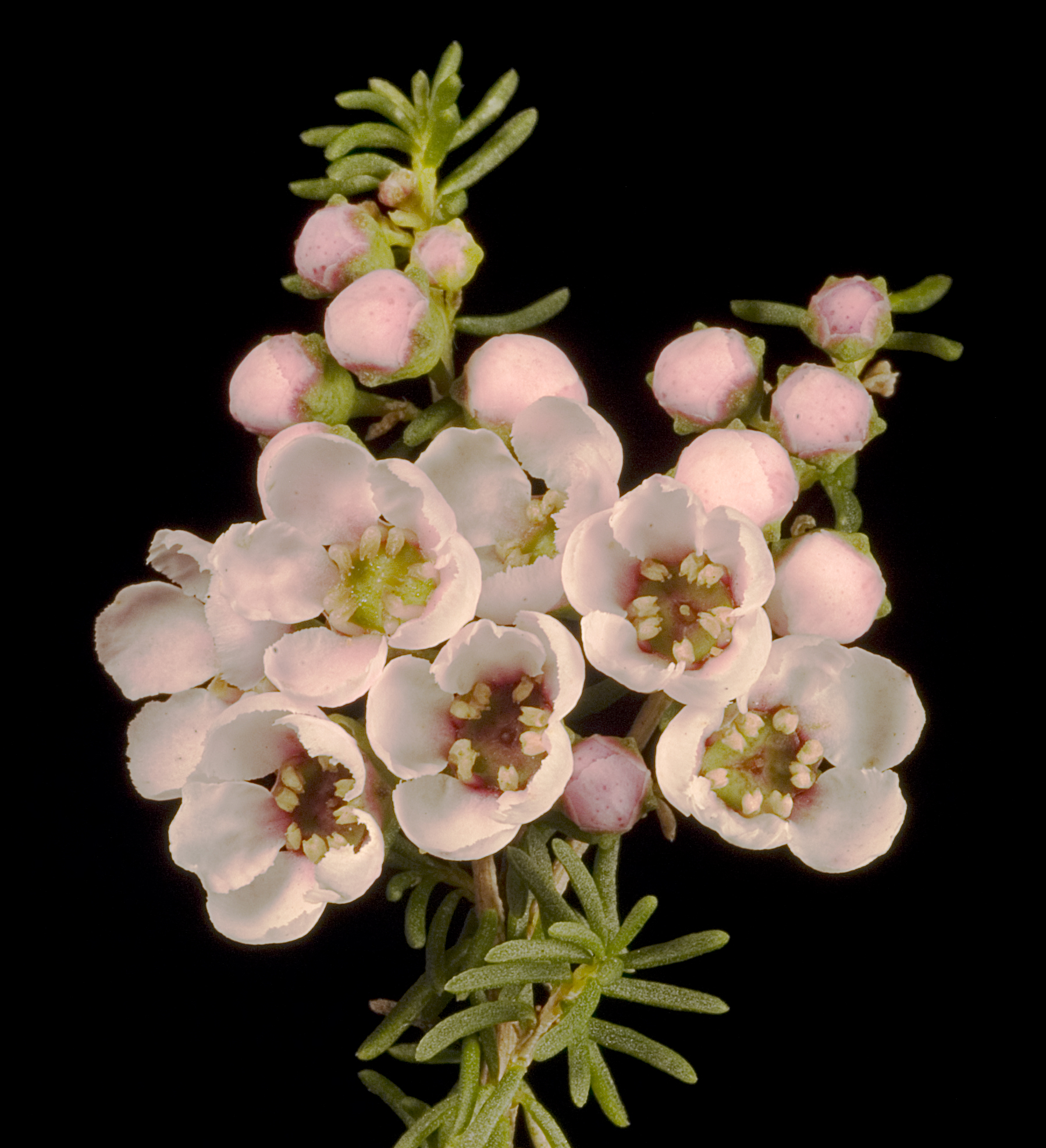
Flowers of Babingtonia camphorosmae (camphor myrtle), a forage plant of the bees
