= Babingtonia erecta =

Scientific classification
- Kingdom: Plantae
- Clade: Tracheophytes
- Clade: Angiosperms
- Clade: Eudicots
- Clade: Rosids
- Order: Myrtales
- Family: Myrtaceae
- Genus: Babingtonia
- Species: B. erecta

Binomial name
- Babingtonia erecta Rye & Trudgen

Species of flowering plant

Babingtonia erecta is a species of flowering plant in the family Myrtaceae and is endemic to the southwest of Western Australia. It is an erect shrub with densely clustered, linear leaves and white or pale pink flowers in groups two to seven in leaf axils, each flower with 8 to 14 stamens.

== Description ==
Babingtonia erecta is a shrub that typically grows to a height of 0.7–3 m (2 ft 4 in – 9 ft 10 in). The leaves are densely clustered, linear, 2.5–6 mm (0.098–0.236 in) long and 0.5–0.8 mm (0.020–0.031 in) wide on a petiole 0.1–0.3 mm (0.0039–0.0118 in) long. The flowers are arranged in groups of two to seven on a peduncle 0.6–3 mm (0.024–0.118 in) long, each flower on a pedicel 1.3–3 mm (0.051–0.118 in) long. The sepals are about 0.6–0.8 mm (0.024–0.031 in) long and 1.3–2 mm (0.051–0.079 in) wide and the petals are white or pale pink, 2.3–3.2 mm (0.091–0.126 in) long. There are 8 to 14 stamens in each flower. The ovary has three locules and the style is 1.3–2 mm (0.051–0.079 in) long. Flowering mainly occurs from October to January, and the fruit is a capsule 1.5–2.3 mm (0.059–0.091 in) long and 2.5–3.5 mm (0.098–0.138 in) wide.

== Taxonomy ==
Babingtonia erecta was first formally described in 2015 by Barbara Rye and Malcolm Trudgen in the journal Nuytsia from specimens collected west of Three Springs in 2003. The specific epithet (erecta) means "upright", referring to the form of the plant and distinguishing it from B. camphorosmae.

== Distribution and habitat ==
This species is found from near Arrino and south-east to Gunyidi and south-west to the Gairdner Range, and grows on lateritic ridges or on hillsides, in the Avon Wheatbelt, Coolgardie and Geraldton Sandplains biogeographic regions of south-western Western Australia.

== Conservation status ==
Babingtonia erecta is listed as "not threatened" by the Western Australian Government Department of Biodiversity, Conservation and Attractions.
