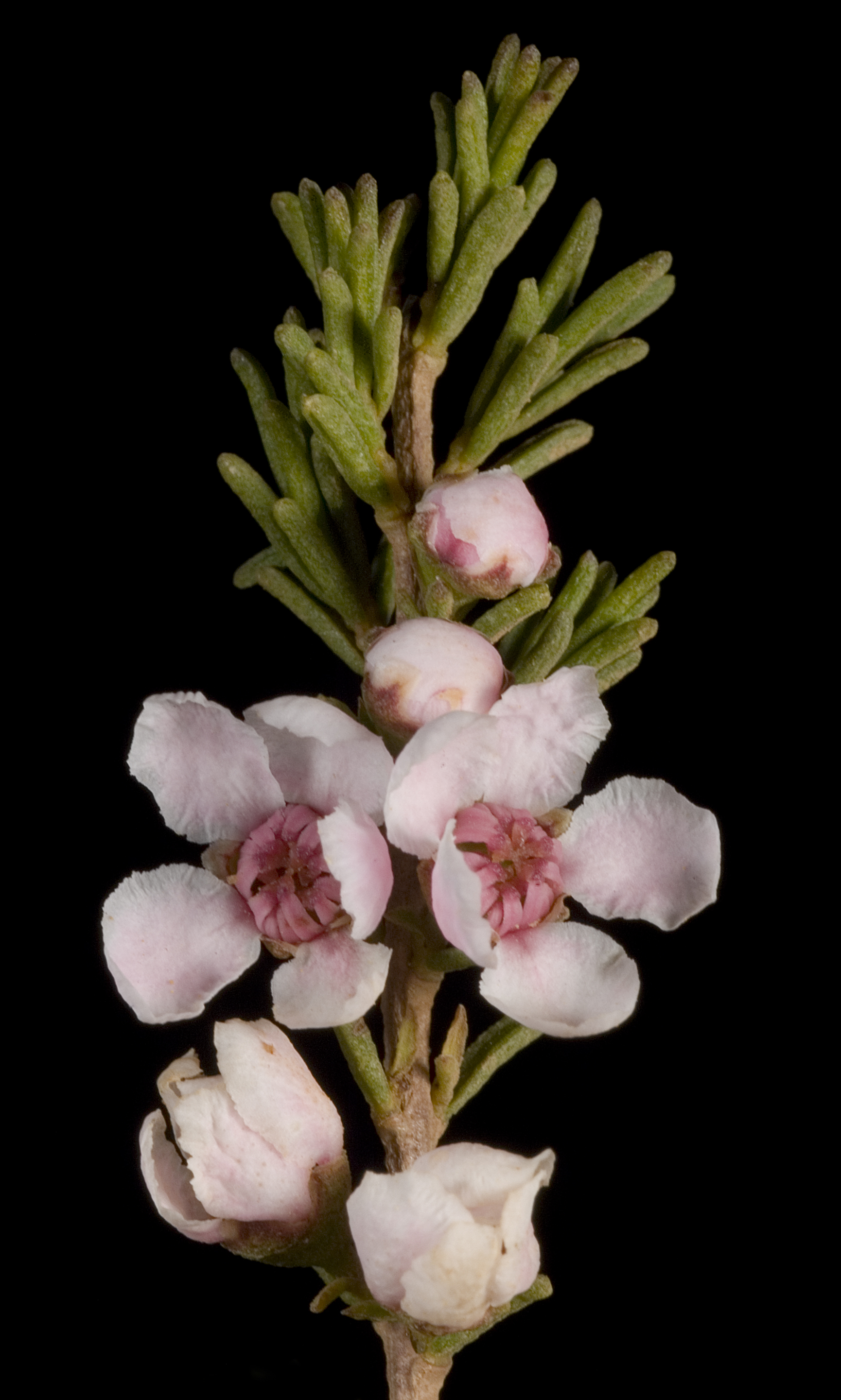

Conservation status
- Priority Three — Poorly Known Taxa (DEC)

Scientific classification
- Kingdom: Plantae
- Clade: Tracheophytes
- Clade: Angiosperms
- Clade: Eudicots
- Clade: Rosids
- Order: Myrtales
- Family: Myrtaceae
- Genus: Babingtonia
- Species: B. cherticola

Binomial name
- Babingtonia cherticola Rye & Trudgen

= Babingtonia cherticola =

Species of flowering plant

Babingtonia cherticola is a species of flowering plant in the family Myrtaceae and is endemic to the southwest of Western Australia. It is an erect shrub with linear leaves and white or pale pink flowers in groups of up to three, each flower with 16 to 26 stamens.

== Description ==
Babingtonia cherticola is an erect shrub that typically grows to a height of 0.5–2 m (1 ft 8 in – 6 ft 7 in) and has slender stems. The leaves are densely clustered, linear, 6–12 mm (0.24–0.47 in) long and 0.6–1.3 mm (0.024–0.051 in) wide on a petiole 0.3–0.6 mm (0.012–0.024 in) long. The flowers are usually arranged in groups of up to three on a peduncle 0.6–1.6 mm (0.024–0.063 in) long, each flower on a pedicel 0.5–2 mm (0.020–0.079 in) long. The sepals are 0.6–1.5 mm (0.024–0.059 in) long and 1.7–2.5 mm (0.067–0.098 in) wide and the petals are white or pale pink, 3.0–4.5 mm (0.12–0.18 in) long. There are 16 to 26 stamens arranged in a single whorl. The ovary has three locules and the style is 2–3 mm (0.079–0.118 in) long. Flowering mainly occurs from November to February and the fruit is a capsule 2.5–3.0 mm (0.098–0.118 in) long and 3.0–3.5 mm (0.12–0.14 in) wide.

== Taxonomy ==
Babingtonia cherticola was first formally described in 2015 by Barbara Rye and Malcolm Trudgen in the journal Nuytsia from specimens collected near Moora in 1993. The specific epithet (cherticola) means "chert-dweller", referring to the species usually growing on chert hills.

== Distribution and habitat ==
This species mostly grows in a range of habitats between Watheroo National Park and Watheroo on chert hills, and near Badgingarra and Cataby on sandplain or in sand over laterite, in the Avon Wheatbelt, Esperance Plains, Geraldton Sandplains and Swan Coastal Plain biogeographic regions of south-western Western Australia.

== Conservation status ==
Babingtonia cherticola is listed as "Priority Three" by the Western Australian Government Department of Biodiversity, Conservation and Attractions, meaning that it is poorly known and known from only a few locations but is not under imminent threat.
