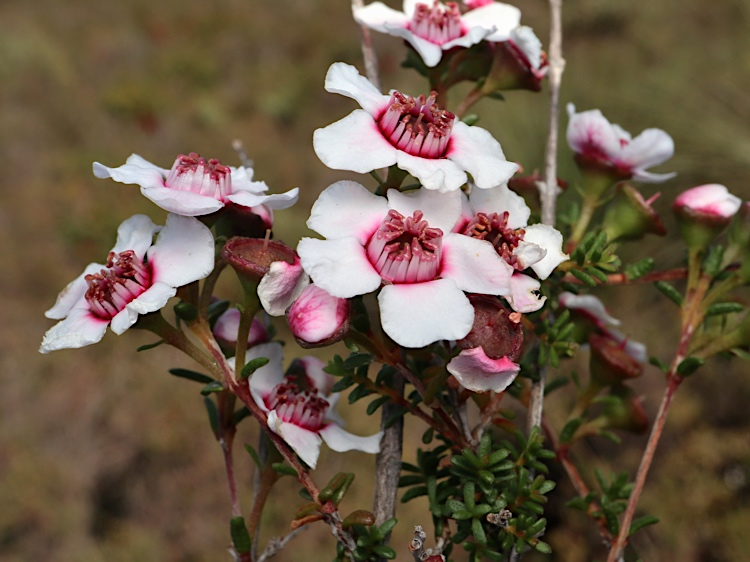
- Near Cataby

Scientific classification
- Kingdom: Plantae
- Clade: Tracheophytes
- Clade: Angiosperms
- Clade: Eudicots
- Clade: Rosids
- Order: Myrtales
- Family: Myrtaceae
- Genus: Babingtonia
- Species: B. grandiflora

Binomial name
- Babingtonia grandiflora (Benth.) Rye

Synonyms
- Baeckea grandiflora Benth.

= Babingtonia grandiflora =

Large flowered babingtonia

Species of flowering plant

Babingtonia grandiflora, commonly known as the large flowered babingtonia, is a species of flowering plant in the family Myrtaceae. It is a common heathland shrub endemic to the coastal southwest of Western Australia. It is a shrub with erect or arching stems, linear leaves and white or pale pink flowers usually arranged singly in leaf axils, each flower with 11 to 25 stamens. Babingtonia grandiflora flowers from August to December.

== Taxonomy ==
This species was first formally described in 1867 by George Bentham in Compositae Flora Australiensis, who gave it the name Baeckea grandiflora, from specimens collected by James Drummond between the Moore and Murchison Rivers. In 2015, Barbara Rye transferred the species to Babingtonia as B. grandiflora in the journal Nuytsia. The specific epithet (grandiflora) means "large-flowered".

== Description ==
Babingtonia grandiflora is an upright, open shrub, that typically grows to a height of 0.5 to 2 metres (2 to 7 ft) and has erect or arching stems. Its leaves are arranged opposite, widely spaced, either decussate or clustered on smaller branches, 2.5 to 10 millimetres (0.10 to 0.39 in) long, 0.5–1.6 mm (0.020–0.063 in) wide, 0.3–0.6 mm (0.012–0.024 in) thick. They can be more or less triangular to rounded or slightly pointed at the apex to terete with the narrower end towards the base, 2.5–9 mm (0.098–0.354 in) long and 0.5–1.6 mm (0.020–0.063 in) wide on a petiole 0.2–0.7 mm (0.0079–0.0276 in) long. The large, single, flowers are usually arranged singly on a pedicel 1–4 mm (0.039–0.157 in) long or multiple flowers on a peduncle 3–9 mm (0.12–0.35 in) long. The sepals are about 0.2–0.7 mm (0.0079–0.0276 in) long and 1.5–3.3 mm (0.059–0.130 in) wide. The petals are white or pale pink, 4.5–6.5 mm (0.18–0.26 in) long and there are 11–25 stamens in each flower. The flowers have a diameter of 10 to 15 mm (0.39 to 0.59 in). The ovary has three locules, each with 10 to 15 ovules. Flowering mainly occurs from August to October, and the fruit is a capsule 2.5–3 mm (0.098–0.118 in) long and 4–5 mm (0.16–0.20 in) wide including the flower parts.

== Distribution and habitat ==
Babingtonia grandiflora often occurs on plains, or on undulating hills and breakaways in the rocky hillsides, or outcrops from near Northampton to Boonanarring Nature Reserve in the Avon Wheatbelt, Geraldton Sandplains, Jarrah Forest and the Swan Coastal Plain bioregions of south-western Western Australia where it grows on gravelly loamy and sandy soils over laterite.
