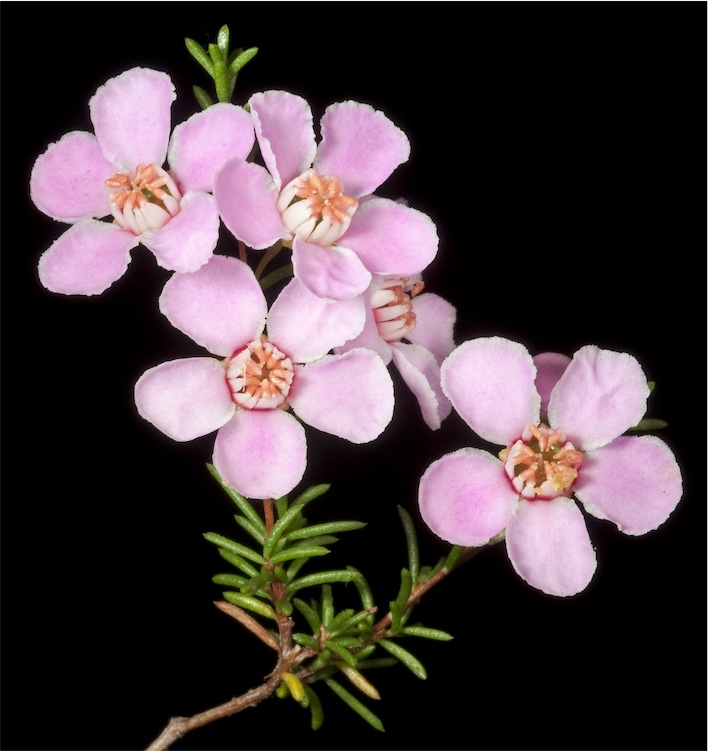
- Babingtonia pelloeae

Scientific classification
- Kingdom: Plantae
- Clade: Tracheophytes
- Clade: Angiosperms
- Clade: Eudicots
- Clade: Rosids
- Order: Myrtales
- Family: Myrtaceae
- Subfamily: Myrtoideae
- Tribe: Chamelaucieae
- Genus: Babingtonia; Lindl.

Species
- See text

Synonyms
- Baeckea sect. Babingtonia (Lindl.) Benth. & Hook.f.

= Babingtonia =

Genus of flowering plants

Babingtonia is a genus of 11 species of flowering plants in the myrtle family, Myrtaceae and is endemic to the south-west of Western Australia. Plants in the genus Babingtonia are glabrous shrubs with simple linear, lance-shaped or elliptic leaves with white flowers arranged singly or in groups of three to seven, in leaf axils.

== Description ==
Plants in the genus Babingtonia are glabrous shrubs, sometimes up to 5 m (16 ft) high, with scaly or fibrous bark. The leaves are simple, arranged in opposite pairs, linear, lance-shaped or elliptic, with oil glands usually only visible on the lower surface. The flowers are arranged singly or in groups of up to seven in leaf axils and are bisexual, radially symmetrical, and have five sepals and five petals. The petals are white, more or less round, 1–6 mm (0.039–0.236 in) wide and have between three and fifteen stamens in a single whorl. The fruit is a woody, hemispherical to bowl-shaped capsule with the remains of the sepals attached.

== Taxonomy ==
The genus Babingtonia was first formally described in 1842 by John Lindley in Edwards's Botanical Register. Lindley nominated Babingtonia camphorosmae, (previously known as Baeckea camphorosmae Endl.) as the type species. The name Babingtonia honours Charles Babington.

Many species formerly placed in the genus are currently included in Sannantha, Baeckea, Oxymyrrhine, Kardomia, Seorsus and Harmogia.

=== Species list ===
The following is a list of species of Babingtonia accepted by the Australian Plant Census as of September 2023:

- Babingtonia camphorosmae (Endl.) Lindl. – camphor myrtle
- Babingtonia cherticola Rye & Trudgen
- Babingtonia delicata Rye & Trudgen
- Babingtonia erecta Rye & Trudgen
- Babingtonia fascifolia Rye
- Babingtonia grandiflora (Benth.) Rye – large-flowered babingtonia
- Babingtonia maleyae Rye & Trudgen – Narrogin babingtonia
- Babingtonia minutifolia Rye & Trudgen
- Babingtonia pelloeae Rye & Trudgen – Pelloe's babingtonia
- Babingtonia triandra Rye & Hislop – triplet babingtonia
- Babingtonia urbana Rye & Trudgen – coastal plain babingtonia
