= Babingtonia minutifolia =

Conservation status
- Priority One — Poorly Known Taxa (DEC)

Scientific classification
- Kingdom: Plantae
- Clade: Tracheophytes
- Clade: Angiosperms
- Clade: Eudicots
- Clade: Rosids
- Order: Myrtales
- Family: Myrtaceae
- Genus: Babingtonia
- Species: B. minutifolia

Binomial name
- Babingtonia minutifolia Rye & Trudgen

Species of flowering plant

Babingtonia minutifolia is a species of flowering plant in the family Myrtaceae and is endemic to a small area in the southwest of Western Australia. It is an erect, widely spreading shrub with narrowly egg-shaped to elliptic leaves and pale pink flowers arranged singly in leaf axils, each flower with 16 to 19 stamens in a circle.

== Description ==
Babingtonia minutifolia is an erect, widely spreading shrub that typically grows to a height of 0.4–1.5 m (1 ft 4 in – 4 ft 11 in) and has very slender branches. The leaves are mostly narrowly egg-shaped with the narrower end towards the base, sometimes elliptic, 0.9–1.6 mm (0.035–0.063 in) long and 0.4–0.7 mm (0.016–0.028 in) wide on a petiole 0.1–0.2 mm (0.0039–0.0079 in) long. The flowers are arranged in singly in leaf axils on a peduncle 1.5–5 mm (0.059–0.197 in) long with bracteoles 0.6–1.2 mm (0.024–0.047 in) long at the base. The sepals are 0.2–0.5 mm (0.0079–0.0197 in) long and 1.3–1.8 mm (0.051–0.071 in) wide pink, or sometimes absent. The petals are pale pink, 3.5–4.0 mm (0.14–0.16 in) long with 16 to 19 stamens in a circle. The ovary has three locules and the style is 2.5–3 mm (0.098–0.118 in) long. Flowering occurs from late September to December, and the fruit is a capsule 2.5–3 mm (0.098–0.118 in) long and 3.0–3.5 mm (0.12–0.14 in) in diameter.

== Taxonomy ==
Babingtonia minutifolia was first formally described in 2015 by Barbara Rye and Malcolm Trudgen in the journal Nuytsia from specimens collected south of Bunjil in 1981. The specific epithet (minutifolia) means "very small leaves".

== Distribution and habitat ==
This species grows on rock outcrops in the area between Perenjori, Carnamah and Bunjil in the Avon Wheatbelt bioregion of south-western Western Australia.

== Conservation status ==
Babingtonia minutifolia is listed as "Priority One" by the Western Australian Government Department of Biodiversity, Conservation and Attractions, meaning that it is known from only one or a few locations which are potentially at risk.
