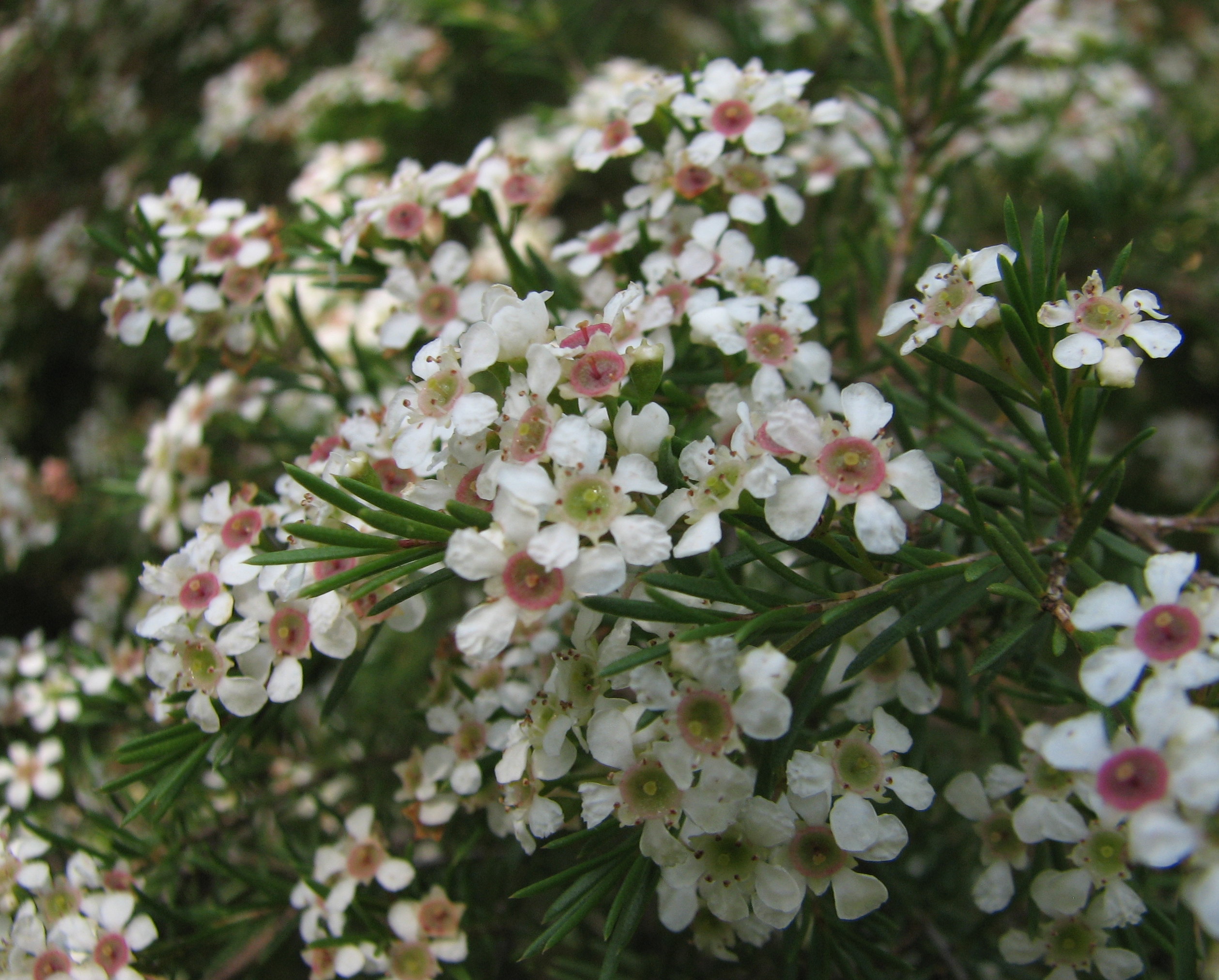
- Harmogia densifolia

Scientific classification
- Kingdom: Plantae
- Clade: Tracheophytes
- Clade: Angiosperms
- Clade: Eudicots
- Clade: Rosids
- Order: Myrtales
- Family: Myrtaceae
- Subfamily: Myrtoideae
- Tribe: Chamelaucieae
- Genus: Harmogia; Schauer
- Species: H. densifolia

Binomial name
- Harmogia densifolia (Sm.) Schauer

Synonyms
- Baeckea densifolia Sm.; Babingtonia densifolia (Sm.) F.Muell.; Harmogia propinqua Schauer

= Harmogia =

Genus of flowering plants

Harmogia is a monotypic genus of flowering plants in the family Myrtaceae. The sole species is Harmogia densifolia which is endemic to Australia.

Harmogia densifolia is a shrub to 1.5 metres high with linear or terete leaves. White flowers appear in spring or summer with 5 round petals surrounding 7 to 10 stamens. It occurs from Nowra in New South Wales northwards through the east of the state and into Queensland.
