= Babingtonia urbana =

Conservation status
- Priority Three — Poorly Known Taxa (DEC)

Scientific classification
- Kingdom: Plantae
- Clade: Tracheophytes
- Clade: Angiosperms
- Clade: Eudicots
- Clade: Rosids
- Order: Myrtales
- Family: Myrtaceae
- Genus: Babingtonia
- Species: B. urbana

Binomial name
- Babingtonia urbana Rye & Trudgen

Species of flowering plant

Babingtonia urbana, commonly known as coastal plain babingtonia, is a species of flowering plant in the family Myrtaceae and is endemic to the southwest of Western Australia. It is a shrub with linear leaves and white or pale pink flowers usually arranged singly in leaf axils, each flower with 16 to 20 stamens in a circle.

== Description ==
Babingtonia urbana is a shrub that typically grows to a height of 40–70 cm (16–28 in). The leaves are more or less linear, 6–13 mm (0.24–0.51 in) long and 0.7–1.2 mm (0.028–0.047 in) wide on a petiole 0.5–0.7 mm (0.020–0.028 in) long. Both surfaces of the leaves have rows of conspicuous oil glands on each side of the mid-vein. The flowers are usually arranged singly in leaf axils on a pedicel 0.7–1.5 mm (0.028–0.059 in) long with bracteoles up to 1.8 mm (0.071 in) long at the base but that fall off as the flowers open. The sepals are usually deep pink, 0.6–0.8 mm (0.024–0.031 in) long and 1.8–2.2 mm (0.071–0.087 in) wide and the petals are white or pale pink, 2.5–3.0 mm (0.098–0.118 in) long with usually 16 to 20 stamens in a circle. The ovary has three locules and the style is 1.5–3 mm (0.059–0.118 in) long. Flowering occurs from January to March, and the fruit is a capsule 2.2–2.5 mm (0.087–0.098 in) long and 2.5–3.0 mm (0.098–0.118 in) in diameter.

== Taxonomy ==
Babingtonia urbana was first formally described in 2015 by Barbara Rye and Malcolm Trudgen in the journal Nuytsia from specimens collected west of Mundijong by Greg Keighery in 1992. The specific epithet (urbana) means "of the city", referring to the species occurring in areas of high human population.

== Distribution and habitat ==
This species grows in wetland mainly between Badgingarra National Park and Mundijong in the Swan Coastal Plain bioregion of south-western Western Australia.

== Conservation status ==
Babingtonia urbana is listed as "Priority Three" by the Government of Western Australia Department of Biodiversity, Conservation and Attractions, meaning that it is poorly known and known from only a few locations but is not under imminent threat.
