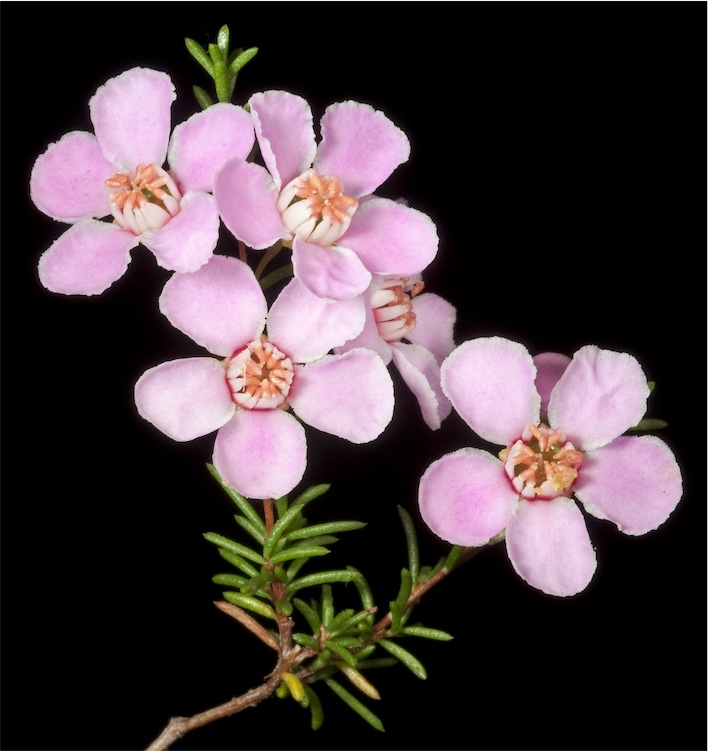
- Near Roleystone

Scientific classification
- Kingdom: Plantae
- Clade: Tracheophytes
- Clade: Angiosperms
- Clade: Eudicots
- Clade: Rosids
- Order: Myrtales
- Family: Myrtaceae
- Genus: Babingtonia
- Species: B. pelloeae

Binomial name
- Babingtonia pelloeae Rye & Trudgen

= Babingtonia pelloeae =

Shrub endemic to Western Australia

Babingtonia pelloeae, commonly known as Pelloe's babingtonia, is a species of flowering plant in the family Myrtaceae and is endemic to the southwest of Western Australia. It is an erect shrub with narrowly oblong to linear leaves and pink flowers usually arranged singly in leaf axils, each flower with 12 to 20 stamens in a circle.

== Description ==
Babingtonia pelloeae is an erect, usually open shrub that typically grows to a height of 30–60 cm (12–24 in) and has slender branches with short side-branches. The leaves are mostly narrowly oblong to linear, 3.5–8 mm (0.14–0.31 in) long and 0.4–0.8 mm (0.016–0.031 in) wide on a petiole 0.2–0.5 mm (0.0079–0.0197 in) long. Both surfaces of the leaves have rows of conspicuous oil glands on each side of the mid-vein. The flowers are usually arranged singly in leaf axils on a pedicel 1.2–1.5 mm (0.047–0.059 in) long with bracteoles 1.2–1.7 mm (0.047–0.067 in) long at the base but that fall off as the flowers open. The sepals are pink, 0.7–1.3 mm (0.028–0.051 in) long and 1.4–2.2 mm (0.055–0.087 in) wide and the petals are pink, 3.3–5.0 mm (0.13–0.20 in) long with usually 12 to 20 stamens in a circle. The ovary has three locules and the style is 1.7–3 mm (0.067–0.118 in) long. Flowering occurs in December and January, and the fruit is a capsule about 2.5 mm (0.098 in) long and 3.0–3.5 mm (0.12–0.14 in) in diameter.

== Taxonomy ==
Babingtonia pelloeae was first formally described in 2015 by Barbara Rye and Malcolm Trudgen in the journal Nuytsia from specimens collected near Carmel in 1999. The specific epithet (pelloeae) honours Emily Harriet Pelloe.

== Distribution and habitat ==
This species grows on open woodland between the Moore River and Roleystone, including the Darling Scarp, in the Jarrah Forest and Swan Coastal Plain bioregions of south-western Western Australia.

== Conservation status ==
Babingtonia minutifolia is listed as "not threatened" by the Western Australian Government Department of Biodiversity, Conservation and Attractions.
