= Babingtonia fascifolia =

Conservation status
- Priority One — Poorly Known Taxa (DEC)

Scientific classification
- Kingdom: Plantae
- Clade: Tracheophytes
- Clade: Angiosperms
- Clade: Eudicots
- Clade: Rosids
- Order: Myrtales
- Family: Myrtaceae
- Genus: Babingtonia
- Species: B. fascifolia

Binomial name
- Babingtonia fascifolia Rye

Species of flowering plant

Babingtonia fascifolia is a species of flowering plant in the family Myrtaceae and is endemic to the southwest of Western Australia. It is a shrub with erect, slender stems, linear leaves and white or pale pink flowers in groups two to seven in leaf axils, each flower with 19 to 23 stamens.

== Description ==
Babingtonia fascifolia is a shrub that typically grows to a height of 30–50 cm (12–20 in) and has erect, slender stems. The leaves are densely clustered, linear, 3–5 mm (0.12–0.20 in) long and 0.5–0.68 mm (0.020–0.027 in) wide on a petiole 0.4–0.6 mm (0.016–0.024 in) long. The flowers are arranged in groups of up to three on a peduncle 0.7–1.4 mm (0.028–0.055 in) long, each flower on a pedicel about 2 mm (0.079 in) long. The sepals are about 0.5–0.7 mm (0.020–0.028 in) long and 1.5–2 mm (0.059–0.079 in) wide and the petals are white or pale pink, 3.0–3.5 mm (0.12–0.14 in) long. There are 19 to 23 stamens in each flower. The ovary has three locules, each with six to nine ovules. Flowering mainly occurs from October to December, and the fruit is a capsule about 2.5 mm (0.098 in) long and 3.5 mm (0.14 in) wide.

== Taxonomy ==
Babingtonia fascifolia was first formally described in 2015 by Barbara Rye in the journal Nuytsia from specimens collected between Yandanooka and Morawa in 1993. The specific epithet (fascifolia) means "bundle-leaved", referring to the densely-clustered leaves.

== Distribution and habitat ==
This species is grows in woodland or shrubland east of Mingenew in the Avon Wheatbelt biogeographic region of south-western Western Australia.

== Conservation status ==
Babingtonia fascifolia is listed as "Priority One" by the Western Australian Government Department of Biodiversity, Conservation and Attractions, meaning that it is known from only one or a few locations that are potentially at risk.
