= Babingtonia triandra =

Conservation status
- Priority Two — Poorly Known Taxa (DEC)

Scientific classification
- Kingdom: Plantae
- Clade: Tracheophytes
- Clade: Angiosperms
- Clade: Eudicots
- Clade: Rosids
- Order: Myrtales
- Family: Myrtaceae
- Genus: Babingtonia
- Species: B. triandra

Binomial name
- Babingtonia triandra Rye & Trudgen

Species of flowering plant

Babingtonia triandra, commonly known as triplet babingtonia, is a species of flowering plant in the family Myrtaceae and is endemic to a restricted area of the southwest of Western Australia. It is a low, spreading to almost prostrate shrub with linear leaves and white flowers usually arranged in groups of up to 16 in leaf axils, each flower with 3 widely spaced stamens.

== Description ==
Babingtonia triandra is a low, spreading to almost prostrate shrub that typically grows to a height of 15–50 cm (5.9–19.7 in), the leaves clustered on short side-shoots. The leaves are linear to very narrowly oblong, 3.4–5.5 mm (0.13–0.22 in) long and 0.4–0.5 mm (0.016–0.020 in) wide on a petiole 0.3–0.4 mm (0.012–0.016 in) long. Both surfaces of the leaves have rows of one or two rows of oil minute glands on each side of the mid-vein. The flowers are arranged in groups, sometimes up to 16 in leaf axils on a peduncle 1.5–4 mm (0.059–0.157 in) long with bracts 0.7–1.5 mm (0.028–0.059 in) long but that fall off as the flowers open, and smaller bracteoles. The sepals are 0.3–0.4 mm (0.012–0.016 in) long and 0.5–0.7 mm (0.020–0.028 in) wide and the petals are white, 1.3–1.5 mm (0.051–0.059 in) long with 3 widely spaced stamens. The ovary has a single locules and the style is 0.5–0.75 mm (0.020–0.030 in) long. Flowering occurs in December to February, and the fruit is a more or less urn-shaped capsule 0.9–1.3 mm (0.035–0.051 in) long and 0.8–1.3 mm (0.031–0.051 in) in diameter.

== Taxonomy ==
Babingtonia triandra was first formally described in 2015 by Barbara Rye and Malcolm Trudgen in the journal Nuytsia from specimens collected in the Calingiri area in 2003. The specific epithet (triandra) means "three stamens".

== Distribution and habitat ==
This species grows in Melaleuca thickets in a winter-wet depression near Calingiri in the Jarrah Forest bioregion of south-western Western Australia.

== Conservation status ==
Babingtonia triandra is listed as "Priority Two" by the Western Australian Government Department of Biodiversity, Conservation and Attractions, meaning that it is poorly known and from only one or a few locations.
