= Seorsus =

Scientific classification
- Kingdom: Plantae
- Clade: Tracheophytes
- Clade: Angiosperms
- Clade: Eudicots
- Clade: Rosids
- Order: Myrtales
- Family: Myrtaceae
- Subfamily: Myrtoideae
- Genus: Seorsus; Rye & Trudgen

Species
- See text.

Genus of plants

Seorsus is a genus of flowering plants in the family Myrtaceae. The occurrence of the four species in Australia and Borneo is widely spaced, and is thought to be indicative that the genus predates the breakup of Gondwana.

Species include:

- Seorsus aequatorius Rye & Trudgen - endemic to West Kalimantan in Borneo.
- Seorsus clavifolius (C.A.Gardner) Rye & Trudgen (syn. Astartea clavifolia) - endemic to the south-west of Western Australia
- Seorsus intratropicus (F.Muell.) Rye & Trudgen (syn. Baeckea intratropica) - endemic to the Northern Territory.
- Seorsus taxifolius (Merr.) Rye & Trudgen (syn. Baeckea taxifolius, Babingtonia taxifolia) - endemic to Sarawak in Borneo.
