= Cataby Important Bird Area =

Important Bird Area in Western Australia

Coordinates: 30°45′10″S 115°33′14″E

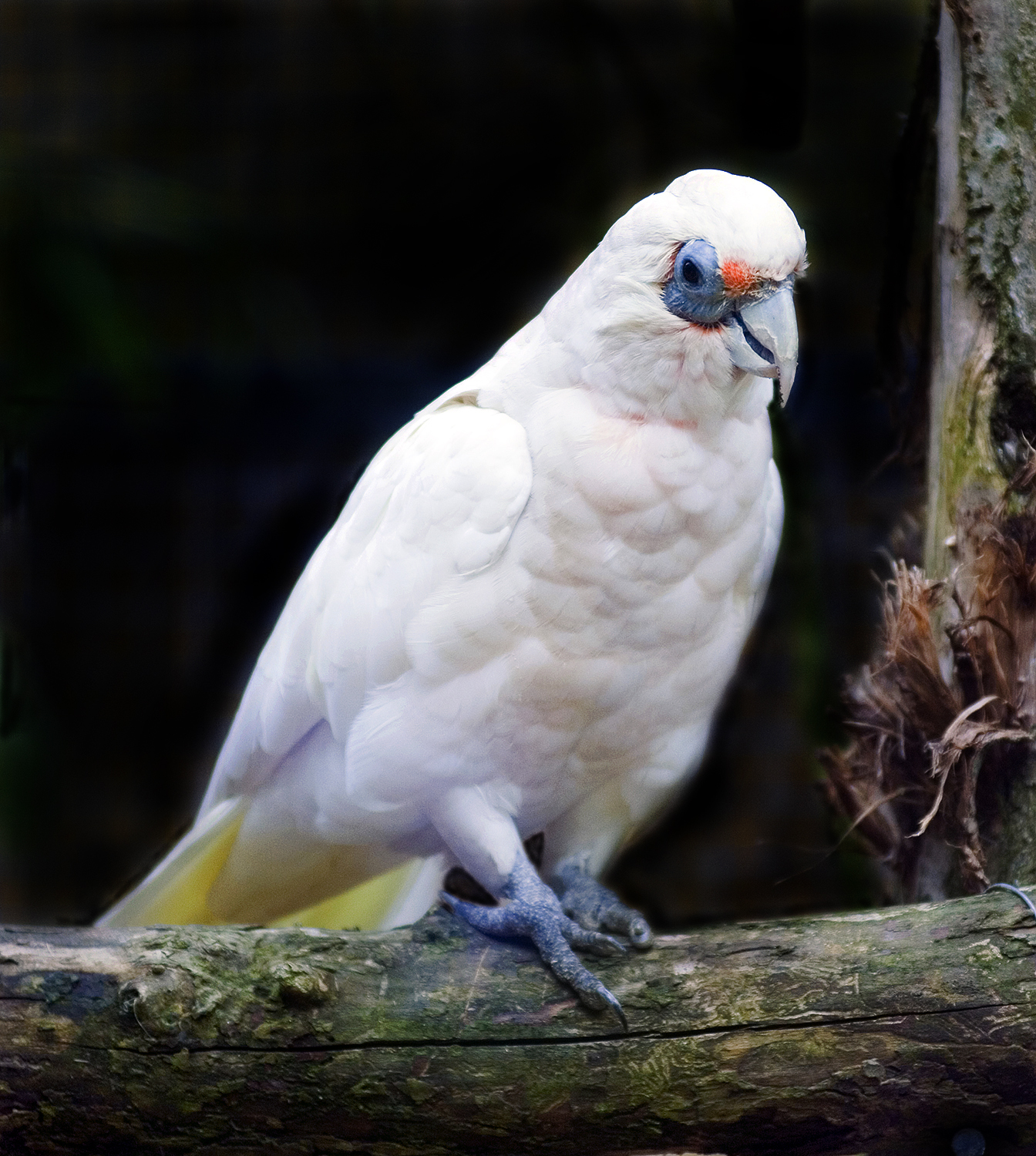
Cataby IBA supports an important population of the restricted-range western corella

Cataby Important Bird Area is a 314 ha tract of land lying about 2 km south of the town of Cataby, adjacent to the Brand Highway, in the Wheatbelt region of Western Australia. It has been classified by BirdLife International as an Important Bird Area (IBA) because it supports up to 24 breeding pairs of short-billed black cockatoo, an endangered species that nests in remnant patches of eucalypt woodland and isolated paddock trees, and feeds in native shrublands. The area also supports the restricted-range western corella and a globally significant population of the regent parrot.
