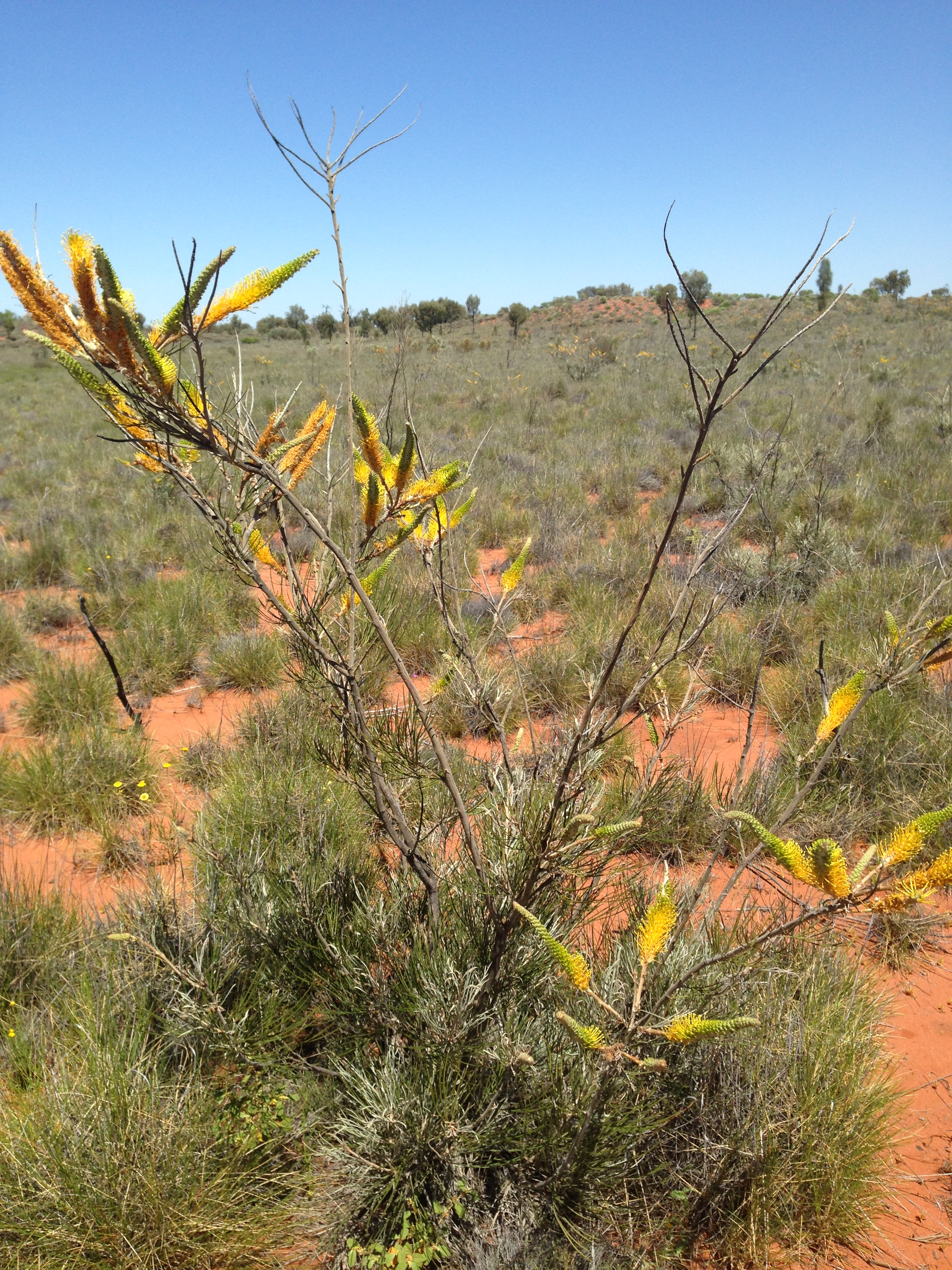
- Near Kata Tjuta

Conservation status
- Least Concern (IUCN 3.1)

Scientific classification
- Kingdom: Plantae
- Clade: Embryophytes
- Clade: Tracheophytes
- Clade: Spermatophytes
- Clade: Angiosperms
- Clade: Eudicots
- Order: Proteales
- Family: Proteaceae
- Genus: Grevillea
- Species: G. eriostachya

Binomial name
- Grevillea eriostachya Lindl.

= Grevillea eriostachya =

Species of shrub

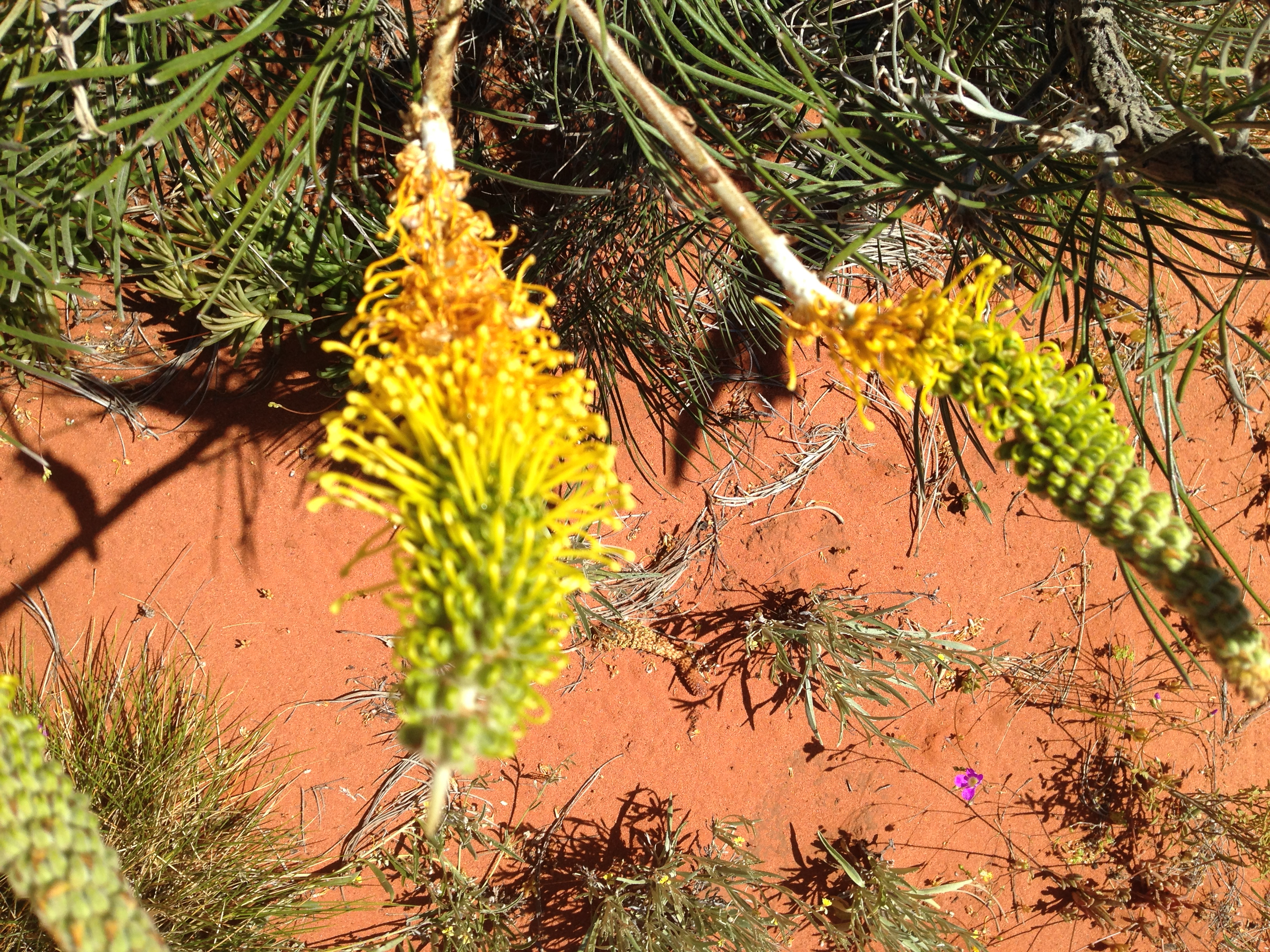
Flower detail

Grevillea eriostachya, also known as yellow flame grevillea or honey grevillea, is a species of flowering plant in the family Proteaceae and is endemic to western parts of Australia. It is a shrub with a leafy base, mostly linear leaves and conical groups of bright yellow flowers on long canes above the foliage.

== Description ==
Grevillea eriostachya is a shrub that typically grows to a height of 1–3 m (3 ft 3 in – 9 ft 10 in) and has a leafy base with long, arching flowering branches covered with woolly hairs. The leaves are 50–300 mm (2.0–11.8 in) long, those on the flowering stems linear, other leaves sometimes with two to seven linear lobes, the leaves or lobes mostly 1–2 mm (0.039–0.079 in) long. The flowers are borne above the foliage in sometimes branched, conical groups of about 100 to 200 flowers on peduncles up to 400 mm (16 in) long, the rachis 75–200 mm (3.0–7.9 in) long, the flowers at the base of each group opening first. The flowers are green in bud, later bright yellow and woolly-hairy, the pistil 14.5–22 mm (0.57–0.87 in) long. Flowering occurs in all months and the fruit is a follicle 15–22 mm (0.59–0.87 in) long.

== Taxonomy ==
Grevillea eriostachya was first formally described in 1840 by John Lindley in A Sketch of the Vegetation of the Swan River Colony. The specific epithet (eriostachya) means "woolly flower-spike".

== Distribution and habitat ==
Flame grevillea grows in heath or shrub on sandplains and is widespread in arid and semi-arid areas of Western Australia, the south-west of the Northern Territory and far north-western South Australia.

== Ecology ==
Nectar-eating birds are attracted to the flowers and are pollinators of this grevillea. Following fires, this species regenerates from a lignotuber within the eastern part of its range in the eremaean province area, and is an obligate seeder in the western part of its distribution.

== Uses ==
Because of the sweet taste of the shrub's flowers, Aboriginal Australians used it as a sweetener and to add variety to their meals.

== Conservation status ==
Grevillea eriostachya is currently listed as least concern on the IUCN Red List of Threatened Species. It has an extremely wide distribution, is common, has a stable population and is not facing any major threats, either at present or in the near future. Some populations south of Perth are impacted by habitat clearance for agriculture.
