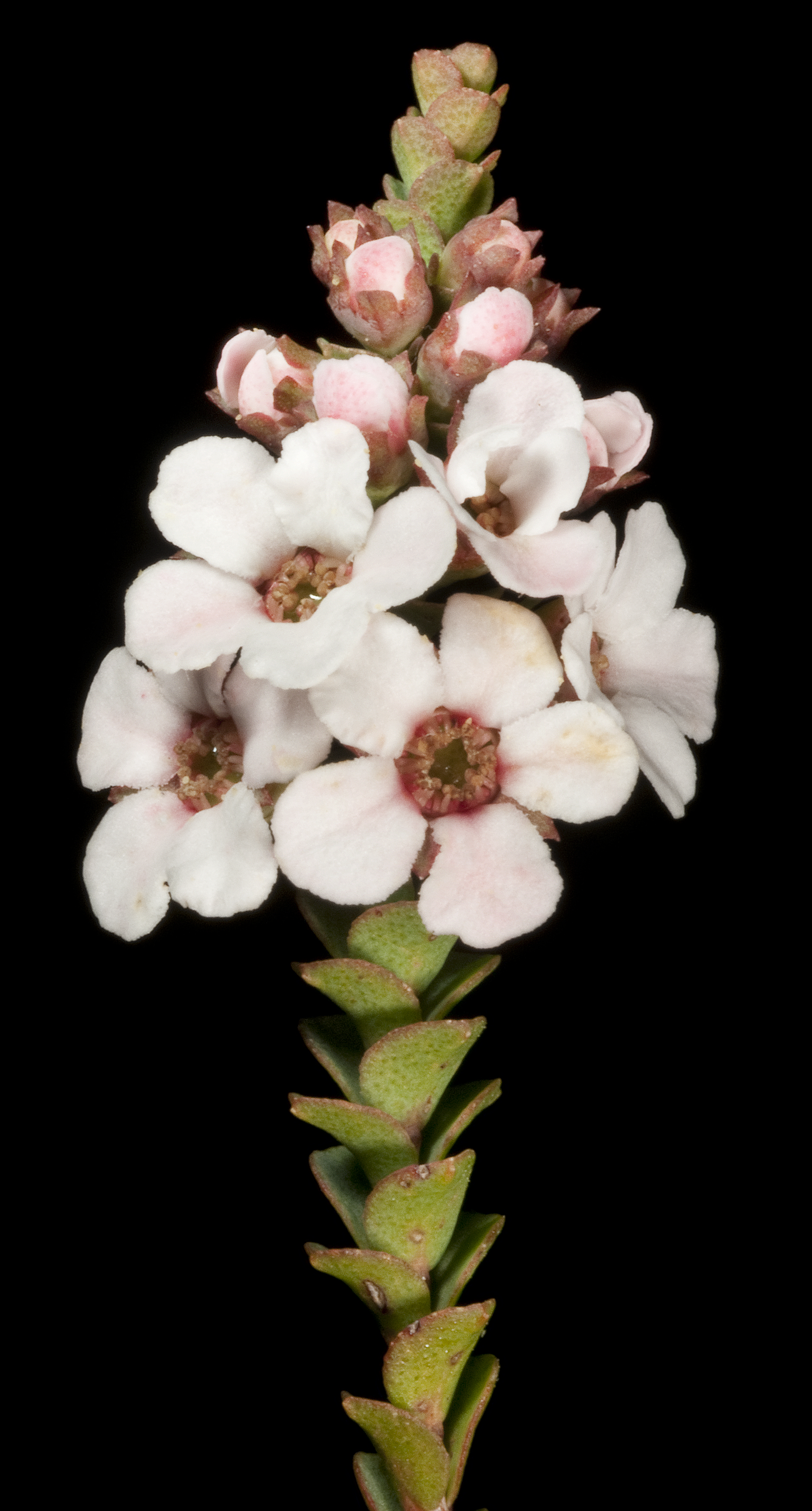
- 𝑂𝑥𝑦𝑚𝑦𝑟𝑟ℎ𝑖𝑛𝑒 𝑐𝑜𝑟𝑜𝑛𝑎𝑡𝑎

Scientific classification
- Kingdom: Plantae
- Clade: Tracheophytes
- Clade: Angiosperms
- Clade: Eudicots
- Clade: Rosids
- Order: Myrtales
- Family: Myrtaceae
- Genus: Oxymyrrhine; Schauer

= Oxymyrrhine =

Genus of plants

Oxymyrrhine is a genus of flowering plants belonging to the family Myrtaceae.

Its native range is Southwestern Australia.

== Species ==
Species:

- Oxymyrrhine cordata Rye & Trudgen
- Oxymyrrhine coronata Rye & Trudgen
- Oxymyrrhine gracilis Schauer
- Oxymyrrhine plicata Rye & Trudgen
