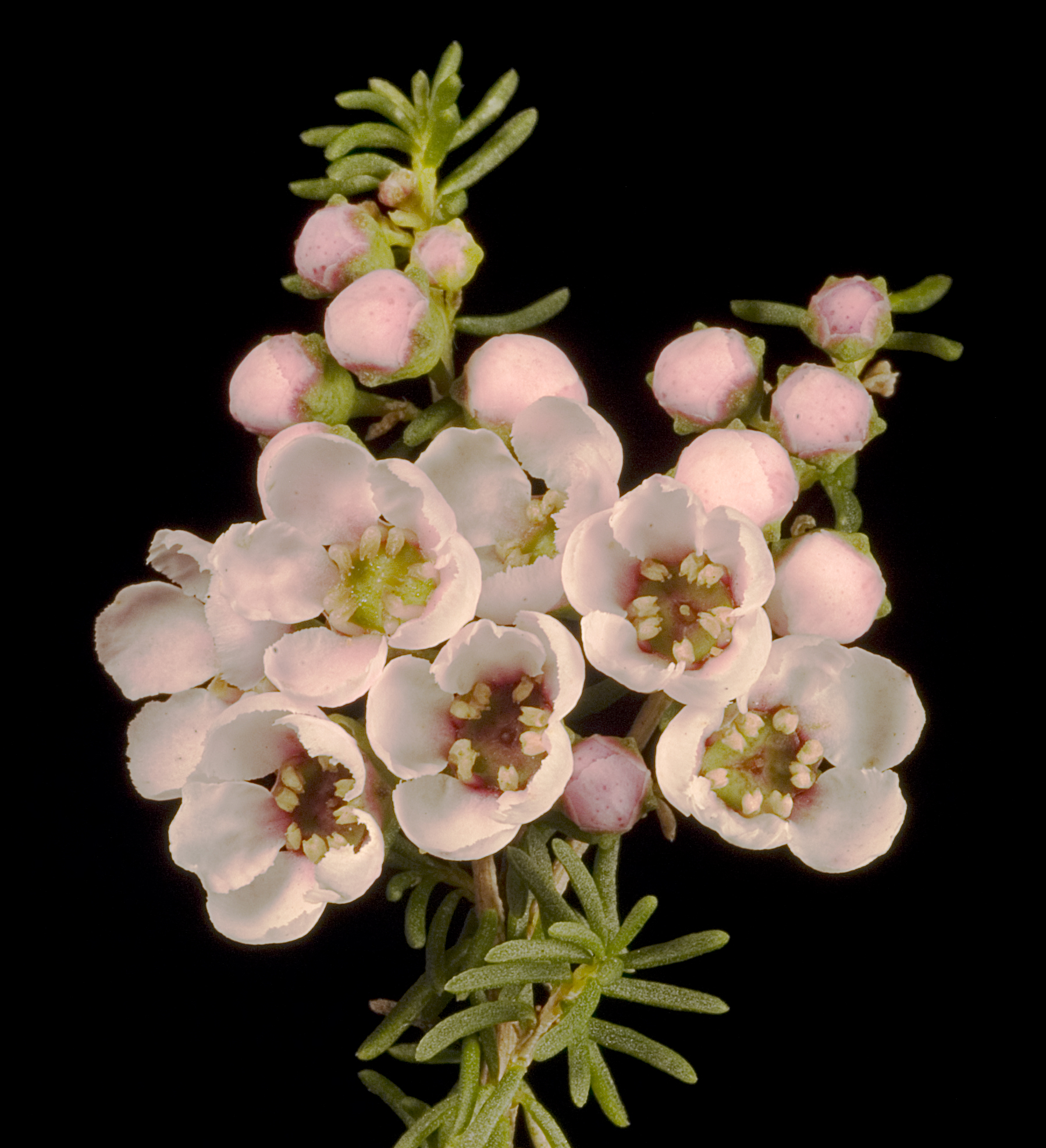

Scientific classification
- Kingdom: Plantae
- Clade: Tracheophytes
- Clade: Angiosperms
- Clade: Eudicots
- Clade: Rosids
- Order: Myrtales
- Family: Myrtaceae
- Genus: Babingtonia
- Species: B. camphorosmae

Binomial name
- Babingtonia camphorosmae (Endl.) Lindl.

Synonyms
- Baeckea camphorosmae Endl.

= Babingtonia camphorosmae =

Species of flowering plant

Babingtonia camphorosmae, commonly known as camphor myrtle, is a species of flowering plant in the family Myrtaceae and is endemic to the southwest of Western Australia. It is a prostrate to low-growing shrub with linear to thread-like leaves and white or pink flowers in groups of up to five, each flower with ten to thirteen stamens.

== Description ==
Babingtonia camphorosmae is a prostrate or low-growing shrub that typically grows to 10–40 cm (3.9–15.7 in) high and 0.4–1.5 m (1 ft 4 in – 4 ft 11 in) wide with prominent glands on its young stems. The leaves are crowded, linear to thread-like, 2.5–7 mm (0.098–0.276 in) long and 0.3–0.4 mm (0.012–0.016 in) wide on a petiole up to 0.3 mm (0.012 in) long. The flowers are arranged singly or in groups of up to five on a peduncle 1–2.5 mm (0.039–0.098 in) long, each flower on a pedicel 1–3 mm (0.039–0.118 in) long. The sepals are 0.5–1 mm (0.020–0.039 in) long and 1.5–2.3 mm (0.059–0.091 in) wide and the petals are white to pink, 3.5–5 mm (0.14–0.20 in) long. There are ten to thirteen stamens arranged opposite the sepals. The ovary has two or three locules and the style is 1.3–1.6 mm (0.051–0.063 in) long. Flowering mainly occurs from November to February and the fruit is a capsule 2.0–2.5 mm (0.079–0.098 in) long and 3.0–3.5 mm (0.12–0.14 in) wide.

== Taxonomy ==
This species was first formally described in 1837 by Stephan Endlicher, who gave it the name Baeckea camphorosmae in Enumeratio plantarum quas in Novae Hollandiae ora austro-occidentali ad fluvium Cygnorum et in sinu Regis Georgii collegit Carolus Liber Baro de Hügel from specimens collected near King George Sound. In 1842, John Lindley transferred the species to the genus Babingtonia as B. camphorosmae. The specific epithet (camphorosmae) means "camphor smell".

== Distribution and habitat ==
Babingtonia camphorosmae mostly grows in woodland and forest in a range of soils, and is found between Dandaragan, Dunsborough, the Whicher Range and Mount Barker in the Avon Wheatbelt, Esperance Plains, Geraldton Sandplains, Jarrah Forest and Swan Coastal Plain biogeographic regions of south-western Western Australia.
