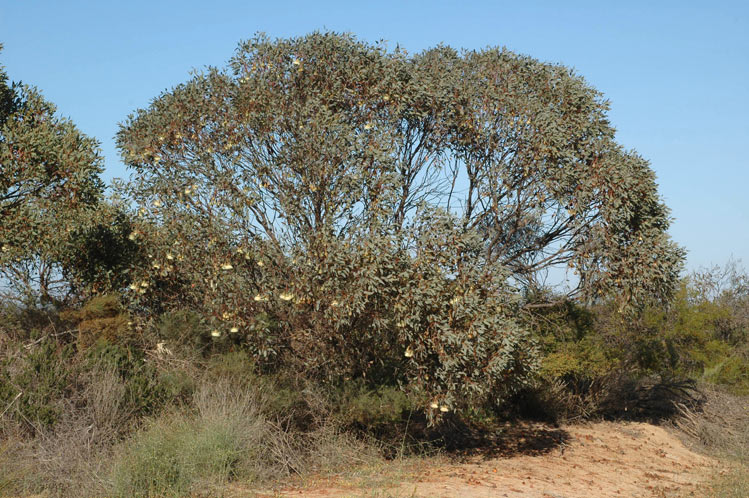
- Eucalyptus pyriformis near Three Springs

Conservation status
- Vulnerable (IUCN 3.1)

Scientific classification
- Kingdom: Plantae
- Clade: Tracheophytes
- Clade: Angiosperms
- Clade: Eudicots
- Clade: Rosids
- Order: Myrtales
- Family: Myrtaceae
- Genus: Eucalyptus
- Species: E. pyriformis

Binomial name
- Eucalyptus pyriformis Turcz.
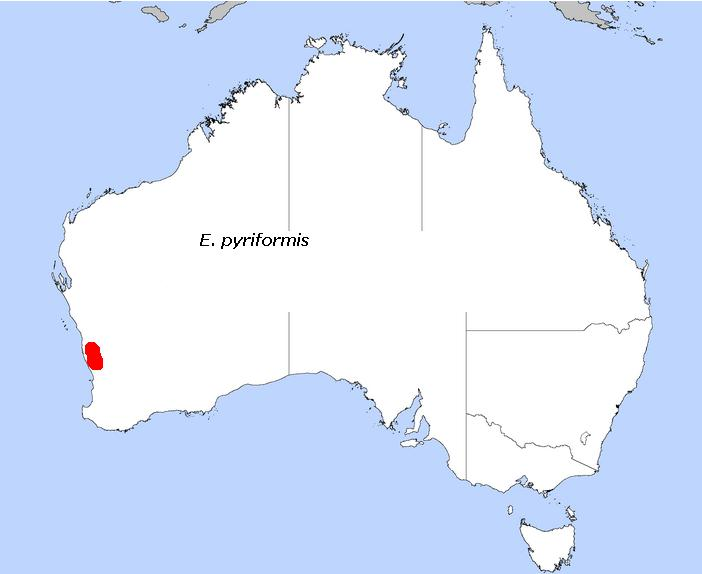
- E. pyriformis, field distribution

Synonyms
- Synonyms: Eucalyptus erythrocalyx Oldfield & F.Muell. ex F.Muell.; Eucalyptus macrocalyx Turcz.; Eucalyptus pruinosa Turcz. nom. illeg.; Eucalyptus pyriformis Turcz. subsp. pyriformis; Eucalyptus pyriformis var. elongata Maiden; Eucalyptus pyriformis Turcz. var. pyriformis

= Eucalyptus pyriformis =

Pear-fruited mallee, Dowerin rose

Species of eucalyptus

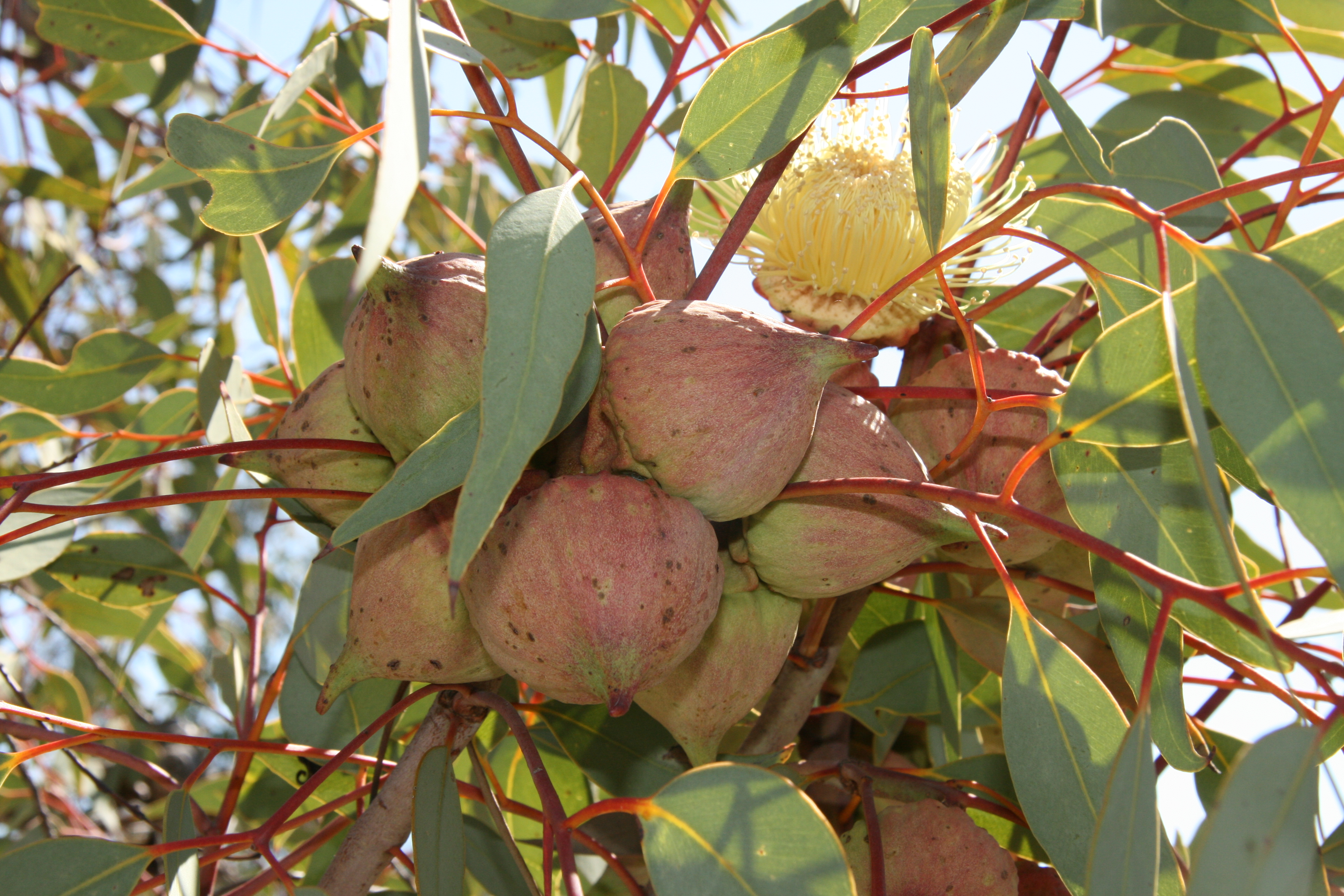
Flower buds and yellow flowers at Burrendong arboretum

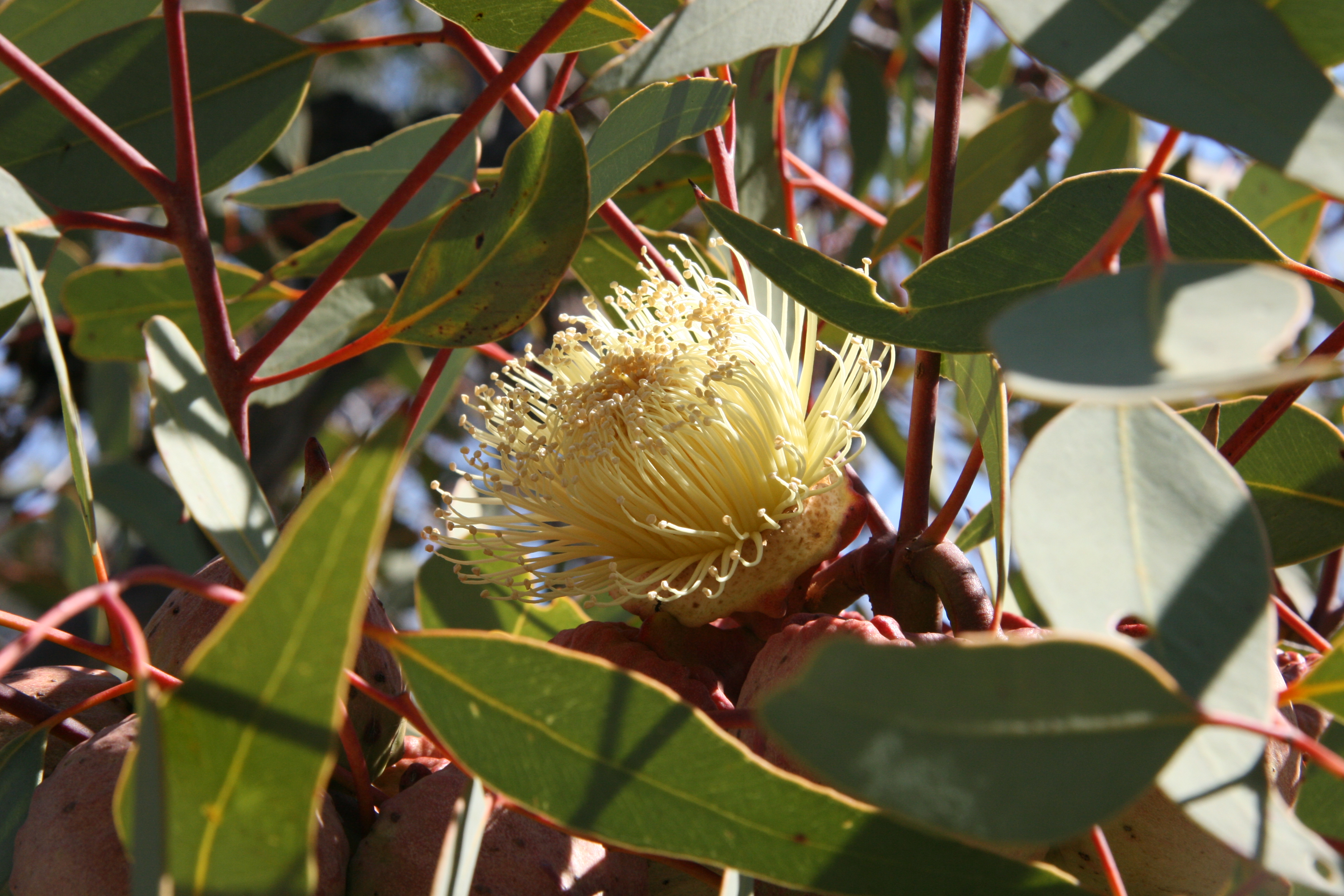
Yellow-flowered form

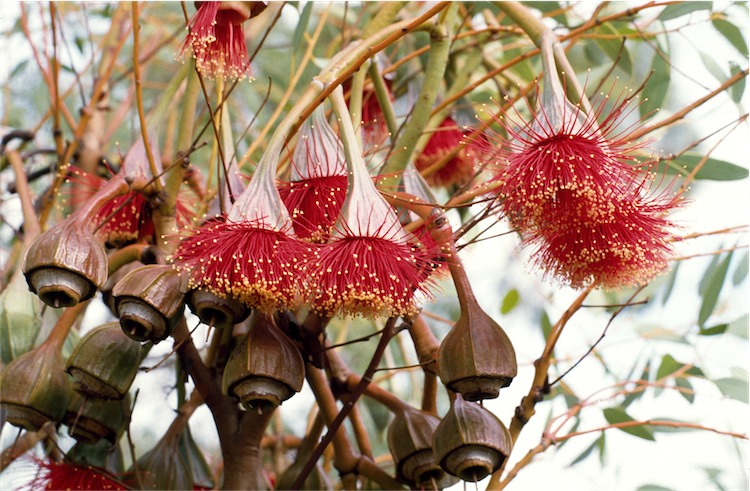
Red flowers and fruit

Eucalyptus pyriformis, commonly known as pear-fruited mallee or Dowerin rose, is a species of low, straggly mallee that is endemic to Western Australia. It has smooth greyish brown bark sometimes with ribbony bark near the base, egg-shaped to lance-shaped adult leaves, flower buds in groups of three, red, pinkish or creamy white flowers and down-turned, conical fruit with prominent ribs.

== Description ==
Eucalyptus pyriformis is a straggly mallee that typically grows to a height of 1.5–5 m (4 ft 11 in – 16 ft 5 in) and to a width of 3–6 m (9.8–19.7 ft) and forms a lignotuber. In nature, it tends to be multi-stemmed but in cultivation it is more likely to be single stemmed. The bark is smooth, grey or salmon-pink coloured, often shedding in ribbons at the base. Young plants and coppice regrowth have leaves that are arranged alternately, dull bluish green, egg-shaped to broadly lance-shaped, 40–70 mm (1.6–2.8 in) long and 30–45 mm (1.2–1.8 in) wide and petiolate. Adult leaves are the same shade of dull bluish or greyish green on both sides, egg-shaped to lance-shaped, 55–95 mm (2.2–3.7 in) long and 15–30 mm (0.59–1.18 in) wide, tapering to a petiole 10–30 mm (0.39–1.18 in) long. Mature buds are oval, 32–60 mm (1.3–2.4 in) long and 20–30 mm (0.79–1.18 in) wide with ribs on the sides and a beaked operculum. Flowering occurs between May and October and the flowers are red, pinkish or creamy white flowers. The fruit is a woody, pendent, conical capsule 25–40 mm (0.98–1.57 in) long and 30–55 mm (1.2–2.2 in) wide on a pedicel 15–60 mm (0.59–2.36 in) long and with prominent ribs on the sides.

== Taxonomy ==
Eucalyptus pyriformis was first formally described by the botanist Nicolai Stepanovitch Turczaninow in 1849 in the journal, Bulletin de la Société Impériale des Naturalistes de Moscou. The specific epithet (pyriformis) is a Latin word meaning "pear-shaped".

== Distribution and habitat ==
Pear-fruited mallee grows in flat and gently undulating country between the Murchison River in the north and Dowerin, Goomalling and Cowcowing in the south.

== Ecology ==
The flowers of E. pyriformis provide abundant nectar and pollen as a food source for wildlife.

== Conservation status ==
This eucalypt is classified as "not threatened" by the Western Australian Government Department of Parks and Wildlife. The IUCN Red List assesses the species as Vulnerable.

== Use in horticulture ==
Eucalyptus pyriformis is distinctive for its large, pendulous buds and spectacular coloured flowers. It is sold commercially as tube stock or as seeds and is planted as an ornamental, as a light screen, habitat for birds and insects and as wind protection. It can tolerate drought and light frost, will grow in coastal or inland areas.

== See also ==
- List of Eucalyptus species
