= Cataby, Western Australia =

Cataby
- Town
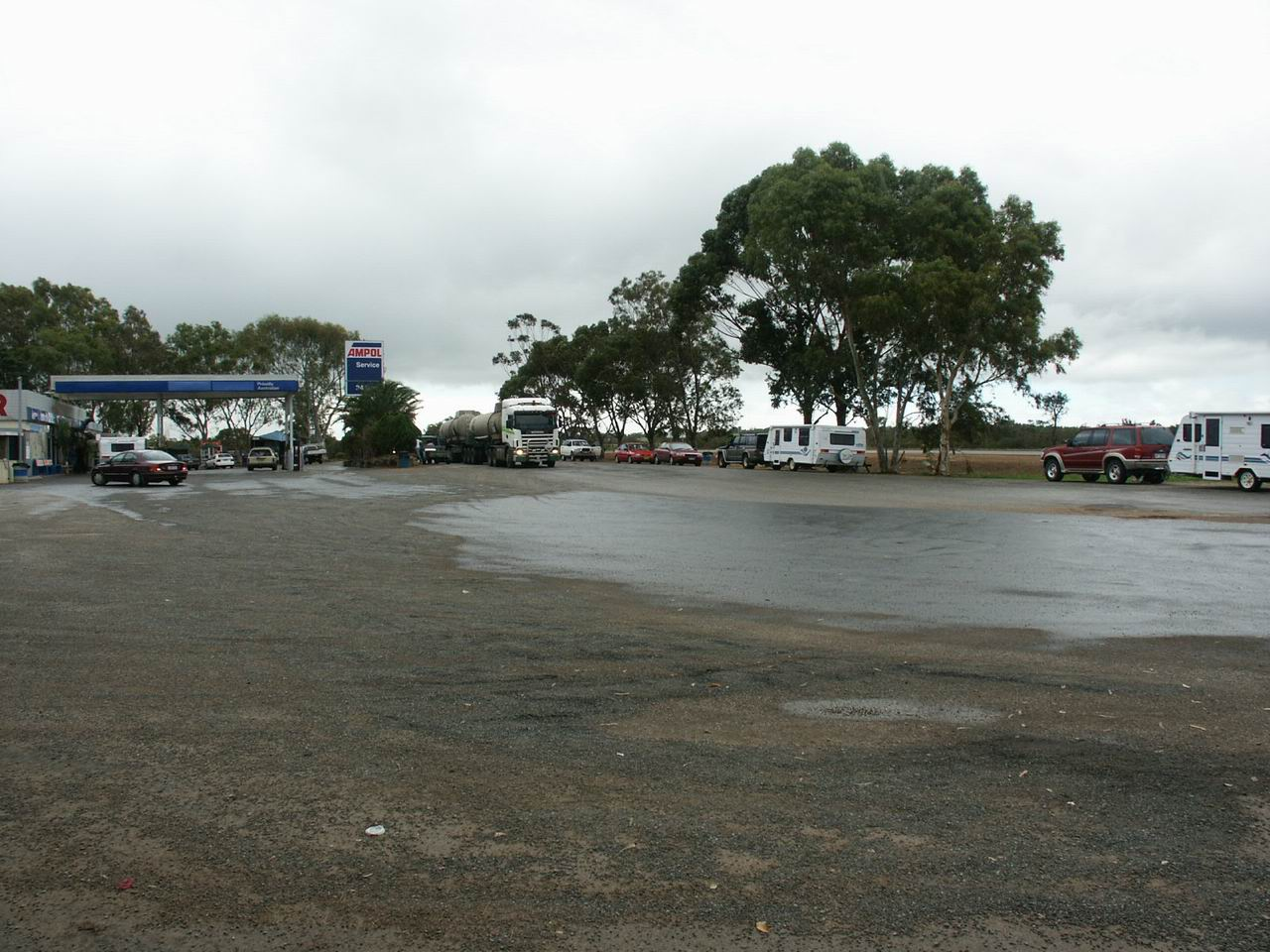
- Cataby roadhouse

- Interactive map of Cataby
- Coordinates: 30°43′12″S 115°25′26″E
- Country: Australia
- State: Western Australia
- LGA: Shire of Dandaragan
- Location: 170 km (110 mi) N of Perth

Government
  - State electorate: Moore
  - Federal division: Durack

Area
  - Total: 178.3 km^{2} (68.8 sq mi)

Population
  - Total: 103 (SAL 2021)
- Postcode: 6507

Cataby is a small settlement approximately 170 kilometres (110 mi) north of Perth, Western Australia on the Brand Highway. The area was once called West Dandaragan, with the town of Dandaragan located 17 km to the east.

The Cataby Important Bird Area, which supports an important breeding population of the short-billed black cockatoo, lies 2 km south-east of the town.

Tronox have a titanium mine site at Cooljarloo, near Cataby. Concentrate is transported by road train to the processing facility at Chandala, near Muchea.

The area has also been explored for mineral sands.

The town was threatened by a bushfire in 2010, which closed the Brand Highway for a few hours; the fire was contained shortly afterward.
