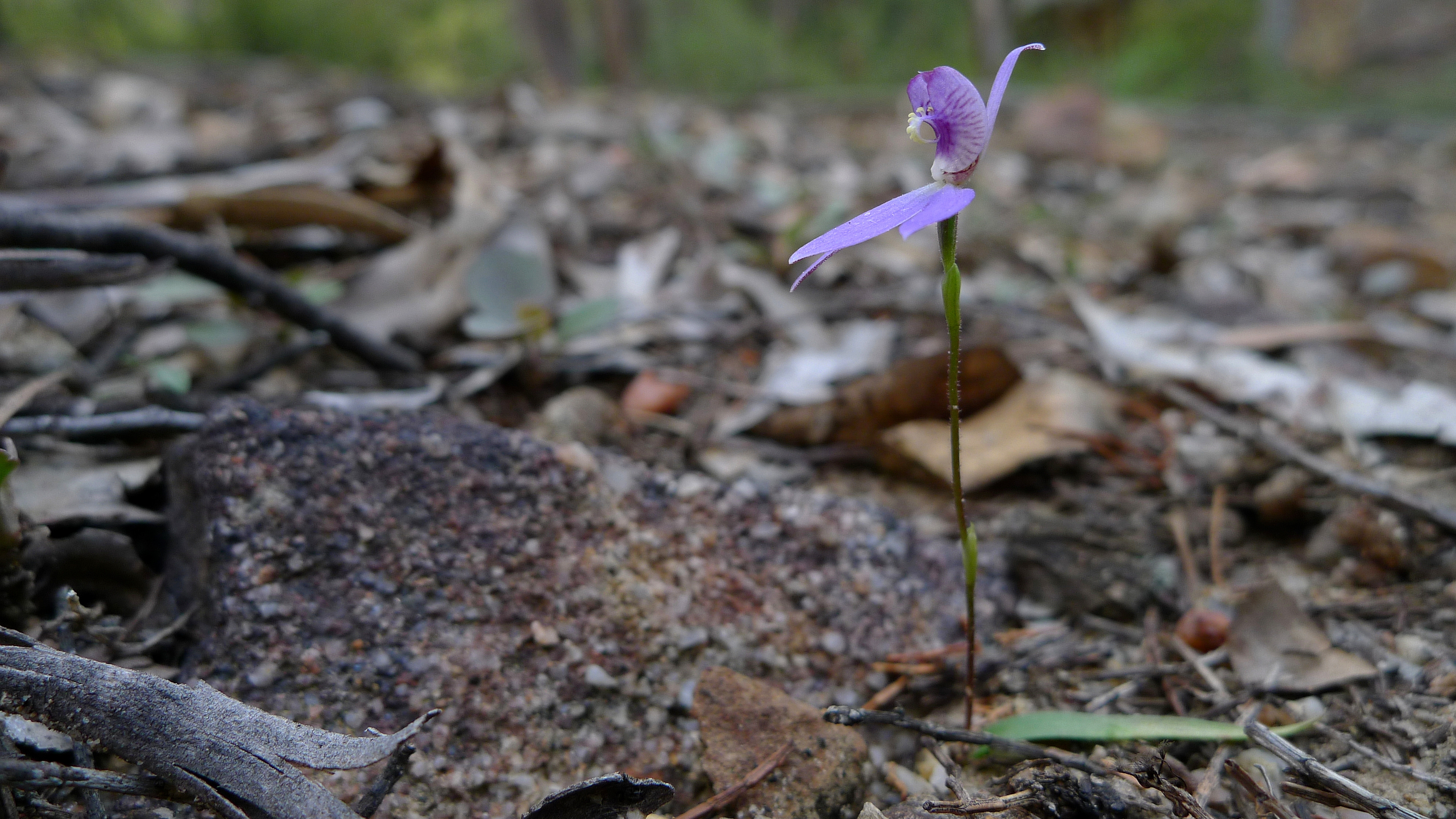
- Cyanicula caerulea

Scientific classification
- Kingdom: Plantae
- Clade: Tracheophytes
- Clade: Angiosperms
- Clade: Monocots
- Order: Asparagales
- Family: Orchidaceae
- Subfamily: Orchidoideae
- Tribe: Diurideae
- Subtribe: Caladeniinae
- Genus: Cyanicula; Hopper & A.P.Br.

Synonyms
- Caladenia sect. Pentisea Lindl.; Cyanicula Hopper & A.P.Br. subg. Cyanicula; Cyanicula subg. Trilobatae Hopper & A.P.Br.; Pentisea (Lindl.) Szlach.

= Cyanicula =

Genus of plants

Cyanicula, commonly known as blue orchids, is a genus of twelve species of plants in the orchid family, Orchidaceae. All are endemic to Australia, eleven are endemic to Western Australia and one species occurs in eastern Australia. While both the common and scientific names refer to "blue", the two subspecies of C. ixioides have yellow or white flowers. They are similar to orchids in the genus Caladenia but differ in their flowers colour and in other important ways.

== Description ==
Orchids in the genus Caladenia are terrestrial, perennial, deciduous, sympodial herbs with a few inconspicuous, fine roots and a tuber partly surrounded by a fibrous sheath. Unlike orchids in the genus Caladenia, the tuber does not produces "droppers" - instead replacing itself within the same cavity. There is a single hairy convolute leaf at the base of the plant. Unlike the hairs on caladenia leaves, the hairs do not have an enlarged cell at their base. The leaf is linear to egg-shaped, fleshy or leathery, lance-shaped to oblong, but is always simple, lacking lobes and serrations.

The inflorescence is a raceme with up to three resupinate flowers. The three sepals and two petals are free and similar in size and shape to each other. As is usual in orchids, one petal is highly modified as the central labellum. The labellum is usually divided into three parts, each of which usually has a fringed or dentate margin, while the central lobe has stalked or button-like calli which are sometimes in rows. The sexual parts of the flower are fused to the column, which has wing-like structures on its sides. Flowering occurs in spring, although more prolifically after fires the previous summer. The fruit that follows flowering is a non-fleshy, dehiscent capsule containing up to 500 seeds.

== Taxonomy and naming ==
James Drummond noticed the different tubers of some orchids and suggested that those that did not produce "droppers" be placed in a separate genus. When John Lindley and others reviewed Caladenia, they placed Caladenia gemmata in Caladenia Section Pentisia. On the basis of molecular phylogenetics studies, in 2000 Stephen Hopper and Andrew Brown formally described the genus Cyanicula in Lindleyana and nominated Cyanicula gemmata as the type species.

The name "Cyanicula" is derived from the Ancient Greek word cyano- meaning "blue" and the suffix -icula meaning "small" referring to the small, (usually) blue flowers of this genus.

Plants of the World Online lists Cyanicula as a synonym of Caladenia.

== Distribution and habitat ==
The Western Australian species of Cyanicula occur throughout the south-west of the state, from as far north as Kalbarri to as far east along the south coast as Israelite Bay. In eastern Australia, Cyanicula caerulea occurs in New South Wales, Queensland and Victoria. In New South Wales, C. caerulea occurs in coastal regions, on the tablelands south from Torrington and on the western slopes of the ranges. Blue orchids are found in a variety of habitats from winter-wet swamps and the margins of salt lakes to stony soils in woodland.

- Cyanicula amplexans (A.S.George) Hopper & A.P.Br. - WA
- Cyanicula aperta Hopper & A.P.Br. - WA
- Cyanicula ashbyae Hopper & A.P.Br. - WA
- Cyanicula caerulea (R.Br.) Hopper & A.P.Br. - Qld NSW Tas Vic
- Cyanicula fragrans Hopper & A.P.Br. - WA
- Cyanicula gemmata (Lindl.) Hopper & A.P.Br. - WA
- Cyanicula gertrudiae (Ostenf.) Hopper & A.P.Br. - WA
- Cyanicula ixioides (Lindl.) Hopper & A.P.Br. - WA
  - Cyanicula ixioides Lindl. subsp. ixioides - WA
  - Cyanicula ixioides subsp. candida Hopper & A.P.Br. - WA
- Cyanicula nikulinskyae Hopper & A.P.Br. - WA
- Cyanicula sericea (Lindl.) Hopper & A.P.Br. - WA
- Cyanicula sp. 'Dale' - WA
- Cyanicula sp. 'Esperance' - WA
