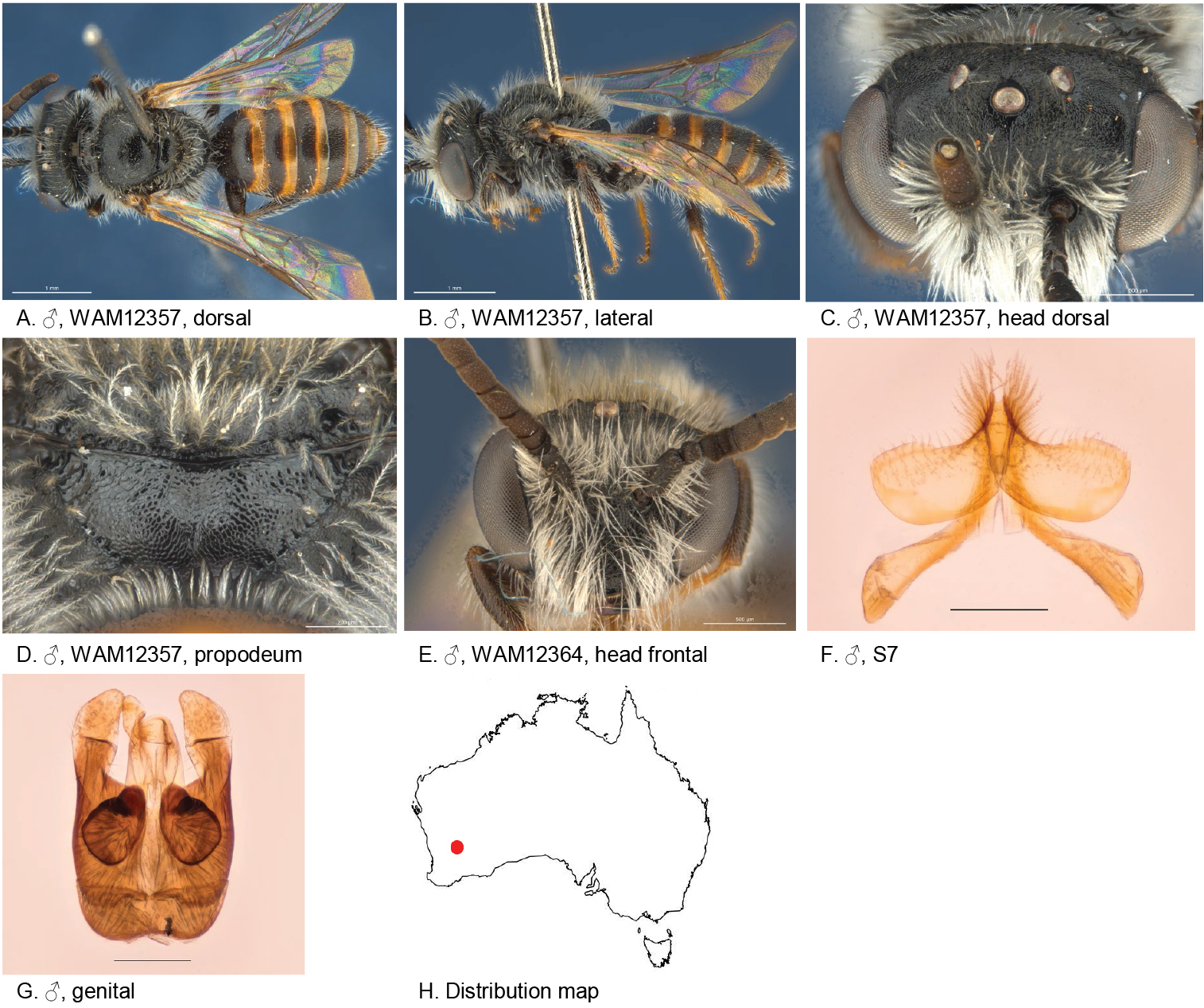
- Male holotype

Scientific classification
- Kingdom: Animalia
- Phylum: Arthropoda
- Clade: Pancrustacea
- Class: Insecta
- Order: Hymenoptera
- Family: Colletidae
- Genus: Leioproctus
- Species: L. rubricinctus

Binomial name
- Leioproctus rubricinctus Leijs 2018

= Leioproctus rubricinctus =

Species of bee

Leioproctus rubricinctus, or Leioproctus (Colletellus) rubricinctus, is a species of bee in the family Colletidae and subfamily Colletinae. It is endemic to Australia. It was described by entomologist Remko Leijs in 2018.

== Etymology ==
The specific epithet rubricinctus is an anatomical reference to the red colour of the anterior parts of T2–4.

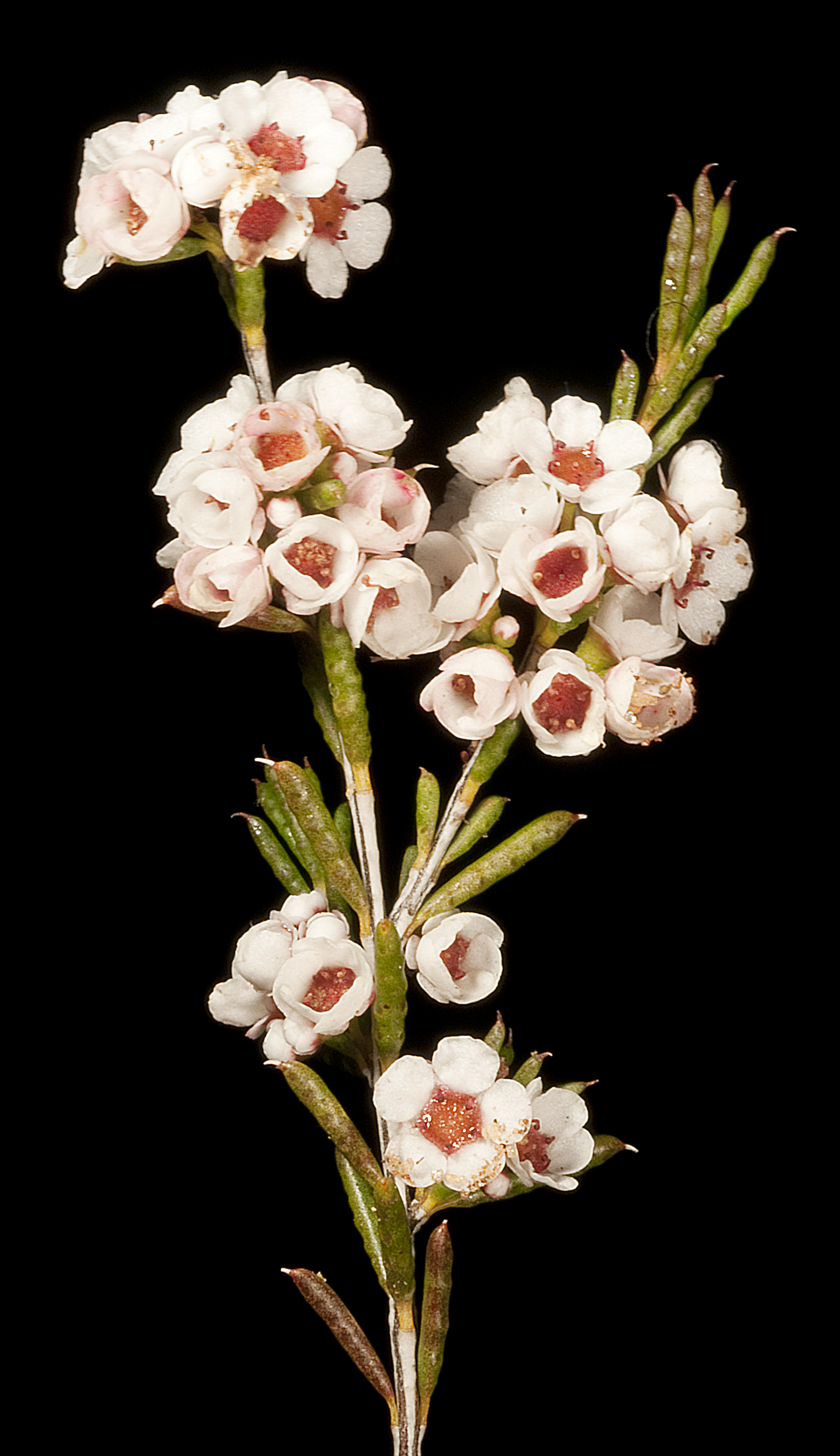
Malleostemon tuberculatus, a forage plant of the bees

== Description ==
The male holotype body length is 4.9 mm, head width 1.7 mm. Integumental colouration is mainly black and orange. The hair is white to off-white.

== Distribution and habitat ==
The species occurs in southern inland Australia]]. The type locality is Bullfinch in the eastern Wheatbelt.

== Behaviour ==
The adults are flying mellivores. Flowering plants visited by the bees include Malleostemon tuberculatus.
