= Cyanicula gertrudae =

Pale china orchid

Scientific classification
- Kingdom: Plantae
- Clade: Tracheophytes
- Clade: Angiosperms
- Clade: Monocots
- Order: Asparagales
- Family: Orchidaceae
- Subfamily: Orchidoideae
- Tribe: Diurideae
- Genus: Cyanicula
- Species: C. gertrudae

Binomial name
- Cyanicula gertrudae (Ostenf.) Hopper & A.P.Br.

Synonyms
- Caladenia gertrudae Ostenf.; Cyanicula gertrudeae G.N.Backh., R.J.Bates, A.P.Br. & L.M.Copel. orth. var.; Cyanicula gertrudiae N.Hoffman & A.P.Br. nom. inval.; Cyanicula gertrudiae Hopper & A.P.Br. orth. var.; Cyanicula gertrudiae Paczk. & A.R.Chapm. nom. inval.; Pentisea gertrudae (Ostenf.) Szlach.; Pentisea gertrudeae Szlach. orth. var.

Species of orchid

Cyanicula gertrudae, commonly known as the pale china orchid, is a plant in the orchid family Orchidaceae and is endemic to the south-west of Western Australia. It has a small, oval leaf and one or two pale blue, sweetly-scented flowers. It is similar to Caladenia gemmata but its leaf is green on both surfaces, the flower is scented and the labellum is striped.

== Description ==
Cyanicula gertrudae is a terrestrial, perennial, deciduous, herb with an underground tuber. It has a single bristly leaf, 30–50 mm (1–2 in) long, 10–15 mm (0.4–0.6 in) wide and green on both surfaces. Up to three pale blue, sweetly-scented flowers 20–50 mm (0.8–2 in) long and wide are borne on a stalk 50–150 mm (2–6 in) tall. The dorsal sepal is erect, 17–25 mm (0.7–1 in) long and 4–8 mm (0.2–0.3 in) wide. The lateral sepals have about the same dimensions as the dorsal sepal and the petals are slightly shorter and narrower. The labellum is 7–10 mm (0.3–0.4 in) long, 5–7 mm (0.2–0.3 in) wide, white with bluish-mauve stripes and a down-turned tip. There are many small, scattered, bead-like calli covering the labellum. Flowering occurs from September to November.

== Taxonomy and naming ==
Pale china orchid was first formally described in 1920 by Carl Ostenfeld who gave it the name Caladenia gertrudae in Biologiske meddelelser, Kongelige Danske Videnskabernes Selskab from a specimen collected in forest near Yallingup Cave (now Ngilgi Cave). In 2000, Stephen Hopper and Andrew Brown transferred the species to Cyanicula as C. gertrudiae. The specific epithet (gertrudae) honours Carl Ostenfeld's daughter Gertrud.

== Distribution and habitat ==
Cyanicula gertrudae occurs along the south coast of Western Australia between Albany and Yallingup in the Jarrah Forest and Warren biogeographic regions, growing between sand dunes.

== Conservation ==
Cyanicula gertrudae is classified as "not threatened" by the Western Australian Government Department of Parks and Wildlife.
