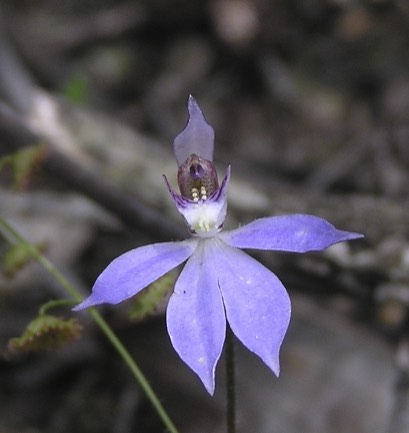
- Cyanicula aperta growing near Ravensthorpe

Scientific classification
- Kingdom: Plantae
- Clade: Tracheophytes
- Clade: Angiosperms
- Clade: Monocots
- Order: Asparagales
- Family: Orchidaceae
- Subfamily: Orchidoideae
- Tribe: Diurideae
- Genus: Cyanicula
- Species: C. aperta

Binomial name
- Cyanicula aperta Hopper & A.P.Br.

Synonyms
- Caladenia aperta (Hopper & A.P.Br.) M.A.Clem.; Cyanicula caerulea subsp. apertala N.Hoffman & A.P.Br. nom. inval.; Cyanicula caerulea subsp. apertala Paczk. & A.R.Chapm. nom. inval.; Caladenia caerulea auct. non R.Br.: Hoffman, N. & Brown, A. (1984); Caladenia caerulea auct. non R.Br.: Green, J.W. (1985)

= Cyanicula aperta =

Western tiny blue china orchid

Species of orchid

Cyanicula aperta, commonly known as the western tiny blue china orchid, is a plant in the orchid family Orchidaceae and is endemic to Western Australia. It has a relatively narrow leaf and a single bluish-mauve flower. It is distinguished from the other two similar blue orchids by the sides of the labellum which are erect but well-separated from the column. This species also has a more easterly distribution than C. amplexans and C. sericea.

== Description ==
Cyanicula aperta is a terrestrial, perennial, deciduous, herb with an underground tuber and a single, hairy leaf, 30–50 mm (1–2 in) long and 4 mm (0.2 in) wide. Usually only one bluish-mauve flower about 20 mm (0.8 in) long and wide is borne on a stalk 50–150 mm (2–6 in) tall. On rare occasions the flower is white and the bluish flowers are a lighter colour on the outside. The dorsal sepal is erect, 11–16 mm (0.4–0.6 in) long and 2–3 mm (0.08–0.1 in) wide. The lateral sepals and petals have about the same dimensions as the dorsal sepal although the lateral sepals are slightly wider. The labellum is 6–9 mm (0.2–0.4 in) long and wide and reddish-mauve with darker bars. The sides of the labellum curve upwards but without surrounding the column. The labellum has a white and yellow down-curved tip and there are two rows of stalked yellow calli along the mid-line of the labellum. Flowering occurs from August to early October.

== Taxonomy and naming ==
Cyanicula aperta was first formally described in 2000 Stephen Hopper and Andrew Brown in Australian Systematic Botany from a specimen collected near Jerramungup. The specific epithet (aperta) is a Latin word meaning "open", referring to the gap between the erect sides of the labellum and the column.

== Distribution and habitat ==
The western tiny blue china orchid is found in areas near the south coast of Western Australia from the Cape Arid National Park to Dumbleyung in the Avon Wheatbelt, Coolgardie, Esperance Plains and Mallee bioregions of south-western Western Australia, growing in heath, in shrubland or on granite outcrops.

== Conservation ==
Cyanicula aperta is classified as "not threatened" by the Western Australian Government Department of Parks and Wildlife.
