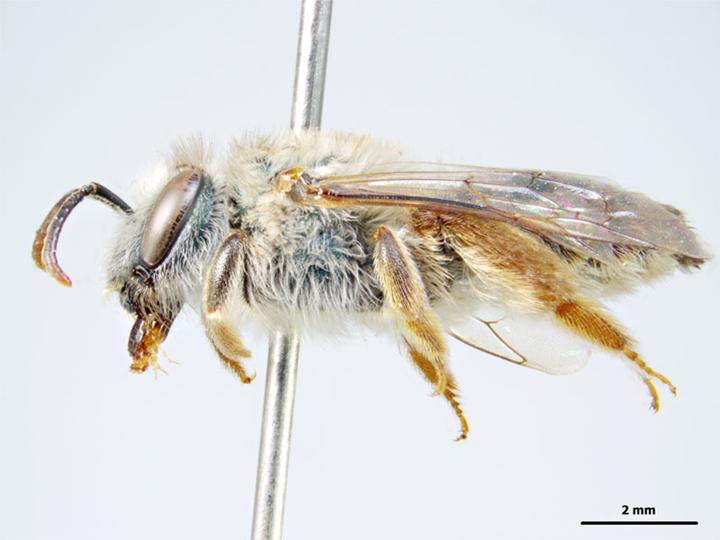
- Female

Scientific classification
- Kingdom: Animalia
- Phylum: Arthropoda
- Clade: Pancrustacea
- Class: Insecta
- Order: Hymenoptera
- Family: Colletidae
- Genus: Leioproctus
- Species: L. cupreus

Binomial name
- Leioproctus cupreus (Smith, 1853)

Synonyms
- Lamprocolletes cupreus Smith, 1853; Paracolletes plumosellus Cockerell, 1905; Paracolletes roseoviridis Cockerell, 1905; Paracolletes nigroclypeatus Cockerell, 1910; Paracolletes chalcurus Cockerell, 1921; Paracolletes nigroclypeatus hardyi Cockerell, 1929

= Leioproctus cupreus =

Species of bee

Leioproctus cupreus, or Leioproctus (Leioproctus) cupreus, is a species of bee in the family Colletidae and subfamily Colletinae. It is endemic to Australia. It was described by English entomologist Frederick Smith in 1853.

== Distribution and habitat ==
The species occurs over much of mainland Australia. Type localities include Adelaide, as well as Perth and Cunderdin, Western Australia.

== Behaviour ==
The adults are flying mellivores. Flowering plants visited by the bees include Physopsis viscida, Eucalyptus conglobata, Eucalyptus gracilis, Eucalyptus leptopoda, Eucalyptus oleosa, Malleostemon tuberculatus and Melaleuca lanceolata.

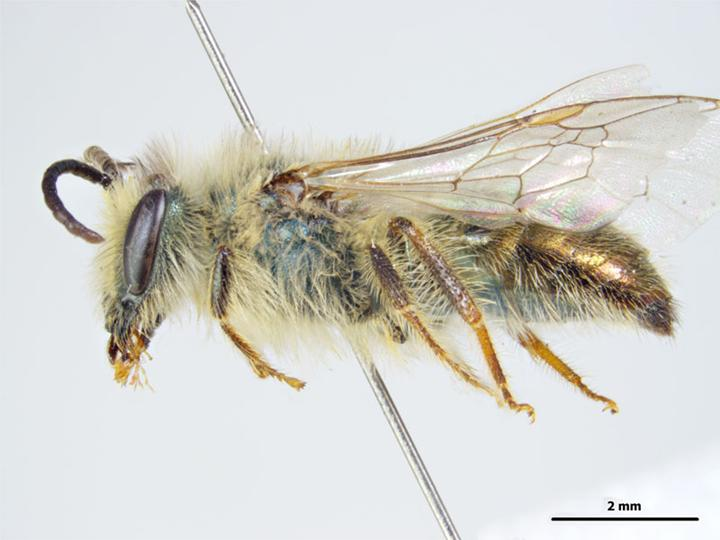
Male
