= Malleostemon costatus =

Conservation status
- Priority Two — Poorly Known Taxa (DEC)

Scientific classification
- Kingdom: Plantae
- Clade: Tracheophytes
- Clade: Angiosperms
- Clade: Eudicots
- Clade: Rosids
- Order: Myrtales
- Family: Myrtaceae
- Genus: Malleostemon
- Species: M. costatus

Binomial name
- Malleostemon costatus Rye & Trudgen

Species of flowering plant

Malleostemon costatus is a plant species of the family Myrtaceae endemic to Western Australia.

It is found in the two locations; one in the Wheatbelt region of Western Australia near Coorow and the other in the Mid West near Northampton where it grows in sandy soils.
