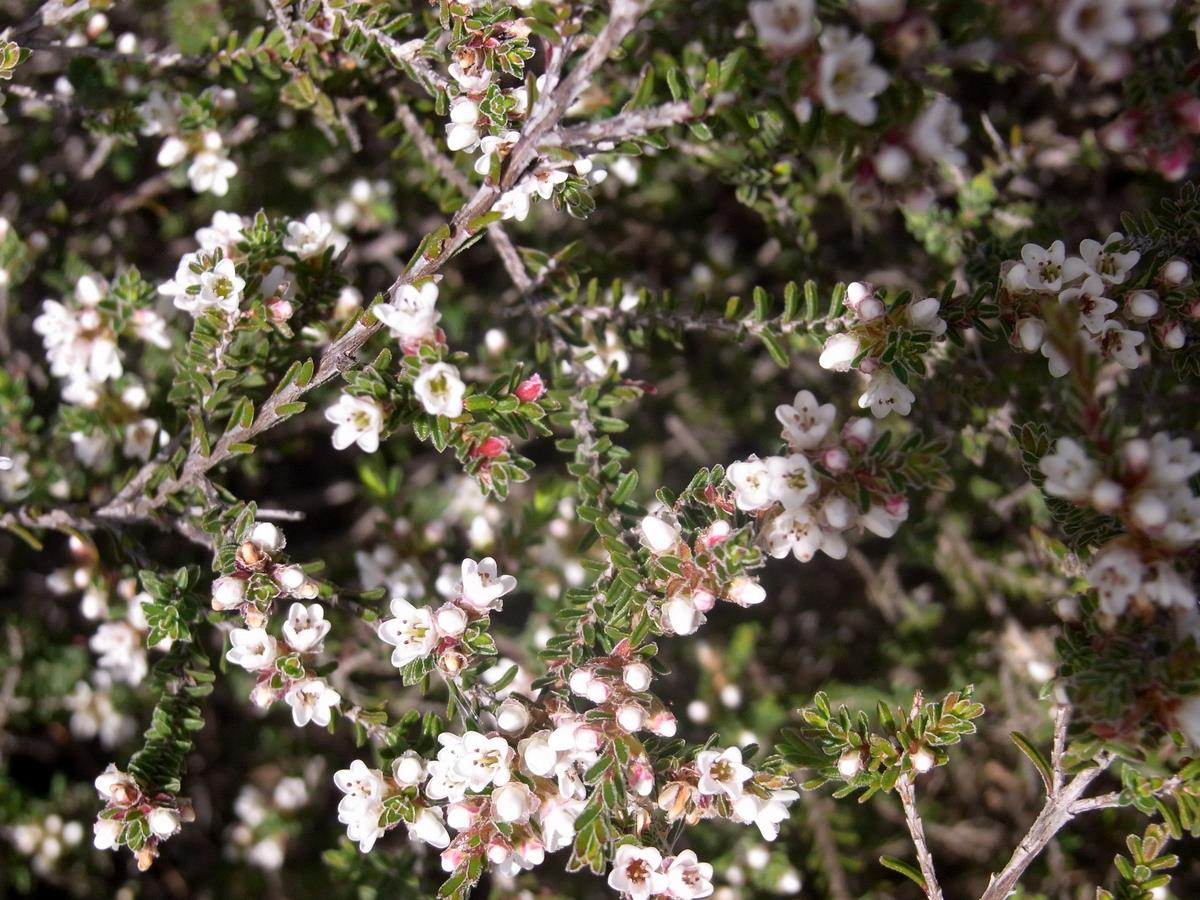
- In Muogamarra Nature Reserve

Conservation status
- Vulnerable (EPBC Act)

Scientific classification
- Kingdom: Plantae
- Clade: Tracheophytes
- Clade: Angiosperms
- Clade: Eudicots
- Clade: Rosids
- Order: Myrtales
- Family: Myrtaceae
- Genus: Micromyrtus
- Species: M. blakelyi

Binomial name
- Micromyrtus blakelyi J.W.Green

= Micromyrtus blakelyi =

Species of shrub

Micromyrtus blakelyi is a species of flowering plant in the family Myrtaceae and is endemic to a small area near Sydney Australia. It is a low, cushion-like shrub with overlapping, keeled, linear leaves and small pink flowers arranged singly in upper leaf axils.

== Description ==
Micromyrtus blakelyi is a spreading, cushion-like shrub that typically grows to a height of 30–60 cm (12–24 in), its young branches densely woolly-hairy. The leaves are more or less sessile, overlap each other, linear, 2.5–4.5 mm (0.098–0.177 in) long, about 1 mm (0.039 in) wide and deeply keeled with a channelled upper surface. The flowers are more or less sessile and arranged singly in upper leaf axils, forming loose clusters near the ends of branches with bracteoles at the base. The sepals are 1.5–2.0 mm (0.059–0.079 in) long and tinged with pink and the petals are pink, elliptic or egg-shaped and 2–3 mm (0.079–0.118 in) long. There are five stamens, the filaments 1.5–2.0 mm (0.059–0.079 in) long. Flowering occurs from August to October.

== Taxonomy ==
Micromyrtus blakelyi was first formally described in 1983 by John Green in the journal Nuytsia from specimens collected by Erwin Gauba (Note: https://www.anbg.gov.au/biography/gauba-erwin.html) between Hornsby and Gosford in 1958. The specific epithet (blakelyi) honours William Blakely who discovered the species.

== Distribution and habitat ==
This species grows in shallow depression in sandstone rocks in shrubby woodland near the Hawkesbury River, from Maroota to Cowan, north of Sydney.

== Conservation status ==
Micromyrtus blakelyi is listed as "vulnerable" under the Australian Government Environment Protection and Biodiversity Conservation Act 1999 and the New South Wales Government Biodiversity Conservation Act 2016. The main threats to the species include inappropriate fire regimes, habitat degradation and loss, and climate change.
