= Conostylis argentea =

Scientific classification
- Kingdom: Plantae
- Clade: Tracheophytes
- Clade: Angiosperms
- Clade: Monocots
- Clade: Commelinids
- Order: Commelinales
- Family: Haemodoraceae
- Genus: Conostylis
- Species: C. argentea

Binomial name
- Conostylis argentea (J.W.Green) Hopper
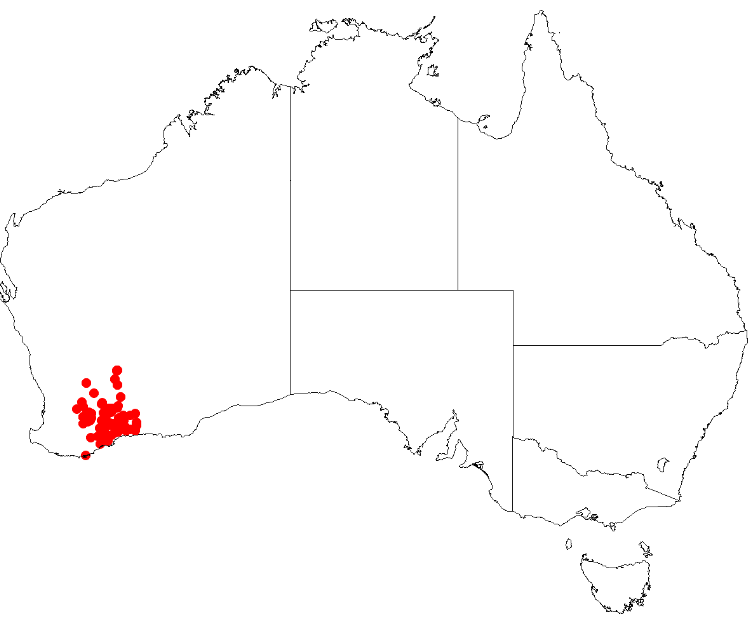
- Occurrence data from AVH

Species of flowering plant

Conostylis argentea is a rhizomatous, tufted perennial plant species in the family Haemodoraceae, endemic to the south-west of Western Australia. In July and August it produces white to cream flowers in the species' native range.

== Description ==
According to FloraBase, the terete leaves are 8 to 13 cm long and about 1 mm wide. The leaves have neither bristles nor hairs on the leaf margin nor the surface of the leaf, but according to Flora of Australia online, the leaves are flat and villous (covered in long soft hairs). There is no scape. The inflorescence is subtended by a bract 10–12 mm long, with one flower. The floral bracts are 10–12 mm long and have sessile pedicels. The radially symmetric flowers are 35–65 mm long, with hairy perianths, are white to cream, with six roughly equal tepals. There are six stamens, all at one level, having filaments which are 7–8 mm long. The anthers have no appendages and are 5.5-5.7 mm long. The style is 25–38 mm long. The plant flowers in July/August.

== Distribution ==
It is found in the Coolgardie, Avon Wheatbelt, Mallee and Esperance plains IBRA bioregion(s), in the South-west Botanical Province.

== Taxonomy ==
It was first described in 1961 by John Green as a subspecies, Conostylis androstemma subsp. argentea. In 1987, Stephen Hopper raised it to species status as Conostylis argentea.
