= Malleostemon nerrenensis =

Conservation status
- Priority One — Poorly Known Taxa (DEC)

Scientific classification
- Kingdom: Plantae
- Clade: Tracheophytes
- Clade: Angiosperms
- Clade: Eudicots
- Clade: Rosids
- Order: Myrtales
- Family: Myrtaceae
- Genus: Malleostemon
- Species: M. nerrenensis

Binomial name
- Malleostemon nerrenensis Rye & Trudgen

Species of flowering plant

Malleostemon nerrenensis is a plant species of the family Myrtaceae endemic to Western Australia.

It is found in a small area in the Mid West region of Western Australia to the south east of Shark Bay where it grows in sandy soils.
