= Thryptomene biseriata =

Scientific classification
- Kingdom: Plantae
- Clade: Tracheophytes
- Clade: Angiosperms
- Clade: Eudicots
- Clade: Rosids
- Order: Myrtales
- Family: Myrtaceae
- Genus: Thryptomene
- Species: T. biseriata

Binomial name
- Thryptomene biseriata J.W.Green

Species of flowering plant

Thryptomene biseriata is a species of flowering plant in the family Myrtaceae and is endemic to arid areas of southern central Australia. It is an erect, multi-stemmed shrub with more or less round to club-shaped leaves and pink flowers with five petals and five stamens.

== Description ==
Thryptomene biseriata is an erect, multi-stemmed shrub that typically grows to a height of 0.3–1.5 m (1 ft 0 in – 4 ft 11 in). Its leaves are more or less round to club-shaped, 1.5–2 mm (0.059–0.079 in) long and sessile with a short point on the tip. The flowers are arranged singly in leaf axils, scattered along the branchlets, each flower on a pedicel 1–2 mm (0.039–0.079 in) long. The five sepals are pink, egg-shaped and 1 mm (0.039 in) long with a distinct claw on the end. The petals are white or pink, slightly longer than the sepals and there are five stamens opposite the sepals. Flowering occurs in March or from October to December.

== Taxonomy ==
Thryptomene biseriata was first formally described in 1986 by John Green in the Flora of South Australia from specimens collected by Alex George, 25.7 km (16.0 mi) north of Cundeelee in 1963. The specific epithet (biseriata) means "arranged in two rows", referring to the sepals and petals.

== Distribution and habitat ==
This thryptomene grows on red sand dunes in the north-west of South Australia and on the Nullarbor Plain and the Great Victoria Desert and Murchison biogeographic regions of Western Australia.

== Conservation status ==
Thryptomene biseriata is classified as "not threatened" by the Western Australian Government Department of Parks and Wildlife.
