= Malleostemon hursthousei =

Scientific classification
- Kingdom: Plantae
- Clade: Tracheophytes
- Clade: Angiosperms
- Clade: Eudicots
- Clade: Rosids
- Order: Myrtales
- Family: Myrtaceae
- Genus: Malleostemon
- Species: M. hursthousei

Binomial name
- Malleostemon hursthousei (W.Fitzg.) J.W.Green

Species of shrub

Malleostemon hursthousei is a plant species of the family Myrtaceae endemic to Western Australia.

The slender erect shrub typically grows to a height of 0.5 to 2 metres (2 to 7 ft). It blooms between September and November producing pink-white flowers.

It is found on sandplains in the Mid West and Wheatbelt regions of Western Australia between Shark Bay and Moora where it grows in sandy soils.
