= Conostylis deplexa =

Scientific classification
- Kingdom: Plantae
- Clade: Tracheophytes
- Clade: Angiosperms
- Clade: Monocots
- Clade: Commelinids
- Order: Commelinales
- Family: Haemodoraceae
- Genus: Conostylis
- Species: C. deplexa

Binomial name
- Conostylis deplexa J.W.Green
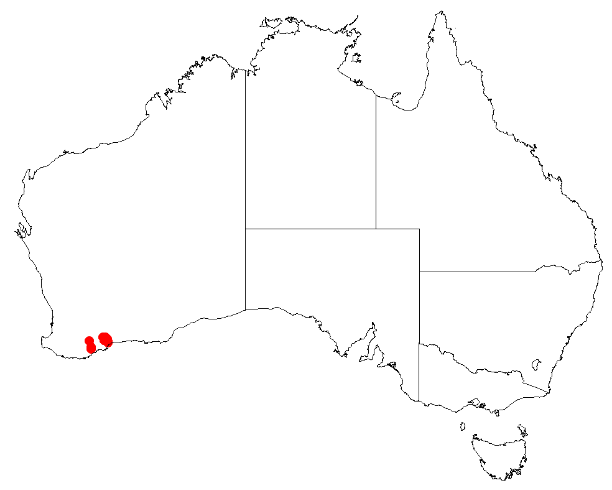
- Occurrence data from AVH

Species of flowering plant

Conostylis deplexa is a rhizomatous, tufted or solitary perennial, grass-like plant or herb in the family Haemodoraceae and is endemic to the south-west of Western Australia. It has flat leaves and uniformly yellow, tubular flowers.

== Description ==
Conostylis deplexa is a rhizomatous, tufted or solitary perennial, grass-like plant or herb that typically grows to 15–22 cm (5.9–8.7 in) high. The leaves are flat, 70–290 mm (2.8–11.4 in) long and 1.5–2.0 mm (0.059–0.079 in) wide and glabrous, apart from bristly hairs on the edges. The flowers are arranged in groups of 10 to 20 on a hairy flowering stalk 45–85 mm (1.8–3.3 in) long with bracts 15–25 mm (0.59–0.98 in) long at the base. The perianth is yellow, 10–15 mm (0.39–0.59 in) long with more or less equal lobes 4–7 mm (0.16–0.28 in) long. The anthers are about 2.5 mm (0.098 in) long and the style 5–8 mm (0.20–0.31 in) long. Flowering occurs from early September to late October.

== Taxonomy and naming ==
Conostylis deplexa was first formally described in 1982 by John Green in the journal Nuytsia from a specimen collected he collected on the Ravensthorpe - Jerramungup road in 1975. The specific epithet (deplexa) means "embracing" or "clasping", referring to the bristles on the leaf margins.

== Distribution and habitat ==
This species of conostylis grows in open shrub mallee, low, closed heath or low open woodland between the Stirling Range and the northern parts of the Fitzgerald River National Park in the Esperance plains and Mallee bioregions of south-western Western Australia.
