= Thryptomene naviculata =

Scientific classification
- Kingdom: Plantae
- Clade: Tracheophytes
- Clade: Angiosperms
- Clade: Eudicots
- Clade: Rosids
- Order: Myrtales
- Family: Myrtaceae
- Genus: Thryptomene
- Species: T. naviculata

Binomial name
- Thryptomene naviculata J.W.Green

Species of shrub

Thryptomene naviculata is a species of flowering plant in the family Myrtaceae and is endemic to central areas of Western Australia. It is a rounded shrub with overlapping, decussate, egg-shaped leaves with the narrower end towards the base and white flowers with five petals and five stamens.

== Description ==
Thryptomene naviculata is a rounded shrub that typically grows to about 1 m (3 ft 3 in) high and wide. Its leaves are decussate, overlapping, broadly elliptic to egg-shaped with the narrower end towards the base, 1.3–1.8 mm (0.051–0.071 in) long and with a keel on the lower surface. The flowers are arranged singly in many upper leaf axils, each flower 4–6 mm (0.16–0.24 in) in diameter and sessile with two bracteoles about 1 mm (0.039 in) long. The sepals are broadly elliptical, petal-like, white or tinged with pink, 1.8 mm (0.071 in) long, the petals similar to the sepals but slightly longer. The central disc of the flower is pale yellowish brown and there are five stamens. Flowering occurs between May and September.

== Taxonomy ==
Thryptomene naviculata was first formally described in 1980 by John Green in the journal Nuytsia from specimens collected by A.S. Mitchell near Karara Well on the Canning Stock Route in 1979. The specific epithet (naviculata) means "like a small boat", referring to the shape of the leaves.

== Distribution and habitat ==
This thryptomene grows on sand dunes in low, open shrubland in the Little Sandy Desert in the Pilbara region of Western Australia.
