= Malleostemon roseus =

Scientific classification
- Kingdom: Plantae
- Clade: Tracheophytes
- Clade: Angiosperms
- Clade: Eudicots
- Clade: Rosids
- Order: Myrtales
- Family: Myrtaceae
- Genus: Malleostemon
- Species: M. roseus

Binomial name
- Malleostemon roseus (E.Pritz.) J.W.Green

Species of shrub

Malleostemon roseus is a plant species of the family Myrtaceae endemic to Western Australia.

The erect or sometimes prostrate shrub typically grows to a height of 0.3 to 2 metres (1.0 to 6.6 ft) and sometimes as high as 3.5 m (11 ft). It blooms between July and December producing pink-white-yellow flowers.

It is found on undulating plains in an area in the extending from the Gascoyne into the Mid West, Wheatbelt and Goldfields-Esperance regions of Western Australia where it grows in sandy or clay soils.
