= Micromyrtus serrulata =

Conservation status
- Priority Three — Poorly Known Taxa (DEC)

Scientific classification
- Kingdom: Plantae
- Clade: Tracheophytes
- Clade: Angiosperms
- Clade: Eudicots
- Clade: Rosids
- Order: Myrtales
- Family: Myrtaceae
- Genus: Micromyrtus
- Species: M. serrulata

Binomial name
- Micromyrtus serrulata J.W.Green

Species of shrub

Micromyrtus serrulata is a plant species of the family Myrtaceae endemic to Western Australia.

The erect to spreading shrub typically grows to a height of 0.4 to 1.5 metres (1.3 to 4.9 ft). It blooms between June and November producing white flowers.

It is found in the Goldfields-Esperance region of Western Australia between Menzies to south east of Kalgoorlie where it grows in sandy to clay soils granite.
