= Thryptomene cuspidata =

Scientific classification
- Kingdom: Plantae
- Clade: Tracheophytes
- Clade: Angiosperms
- Clade: Eudicots
- Clade: Rosids
- Order: Myrtales
- Family: Myrtaceae
- Genus: Thryptomene
- Species: T. cuspidata

Binomial name
- Thryptomene cuspidata (Turcz.) J.W.Green

Synonyms
- Paryphantha cuspidata Turcz.; Thryptomene tenella Benth. nom. illeg., nom. superfl.

Species of shrub

Thryptomene cuspidata is a species of flowering plant in the family Myrtaceae and is endemic to Western Australia. It is a dense erect shrub that typically grows to a height of 0.6–2.2 m (2 ft 0 in – 7 ft 3 in) and blooms between July and November producing white or pink flowers.

The species was first formally described in 1852 by Nikolai Turczaninow and given the name Paryphantha cuspidata in the Bulletin de la classe physico-mathematique de l'Academie Imperiale des sciences de Saint-Petersburg. In 1985, John Green changed the name to Thryptomene cuspidata.

Thryptomene cuspidata is found on plains and among granite outcrops in the Avon Wheatbelt, Coolgardie, Geraldton Sandplains and Mallee biogeographic regions in the south-west of Western Australia where it grows in sandy to gravelly soils.
