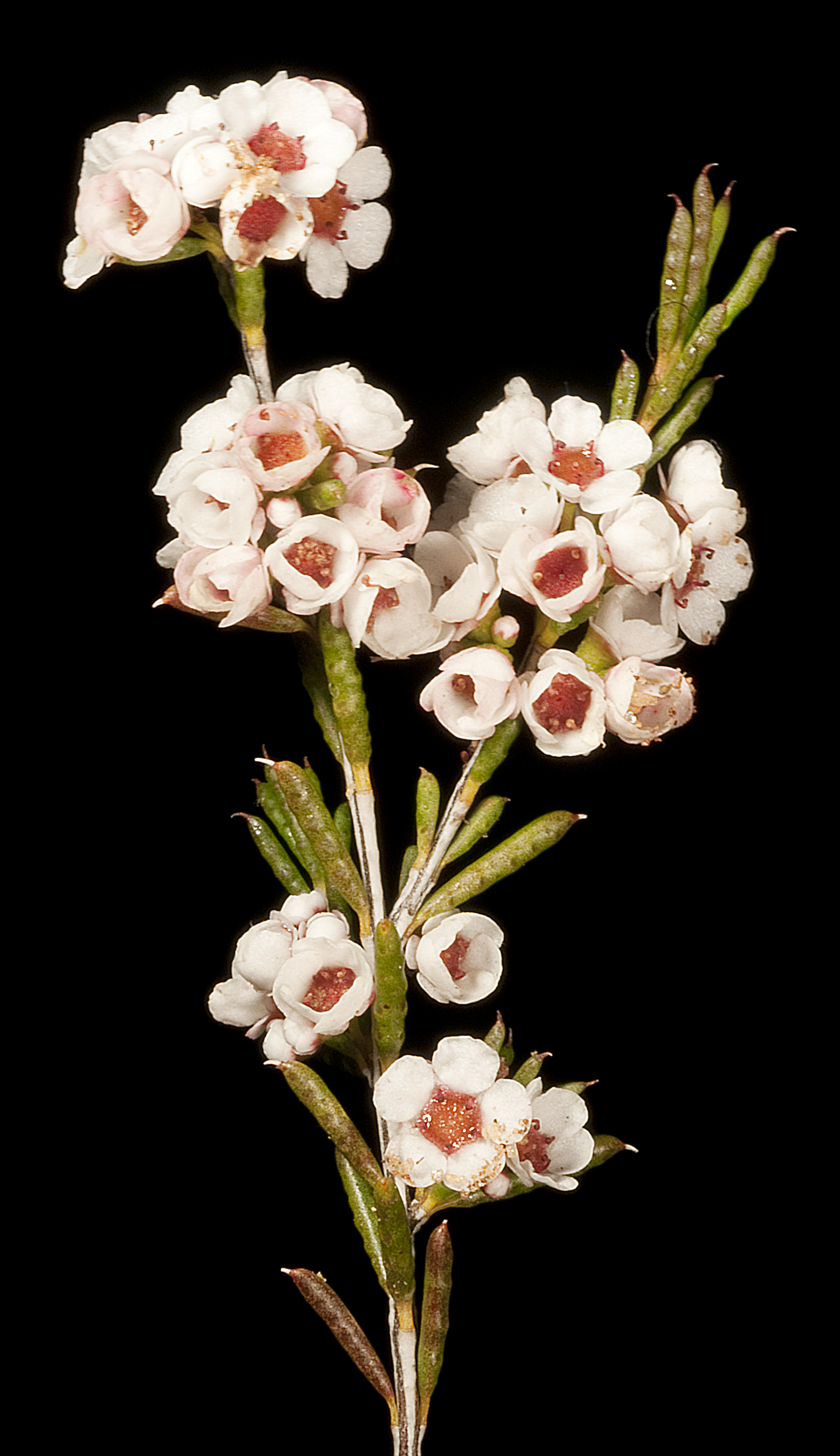
- Malleostemon tuberculatus

Scientific classification
- Kingdom: Plantae
- Clade: Tracheophytes
- Clade: Angiosperms
- Clade: Eudicots
- Clade: Rosids
- Order: Myrtales
- Family: Myrtaceae
- Subfamily: Myrtoideae
- Tribe: Chamelaucieae
- Genus: Malleostemon; J.W.Green

= Malleostemon =

Genus of flowering plants

Malleostemon is a genus of flowering plants in the myrtle family Myrtaceae, described as a genus in 1983, by John Green The entire genus is endemic to Western Australia.

Species

- Malleostemon costatus Rye & Trudgen
- Malleostemon decipiens (W.Fitzg.) Trudgen
- Malleostemon hursthousei (W.Fitzg.) J.W.Green
- Malleostemon microphyllus Rye & Trudgen
- Malleostemon minilyaensis J.W.Green
- Malleostemon nephroideus Rye
- Malleostemon nerrenensis Rye & Trudgen
- Malleostemon pedunculatus J.W.Green
- Malleostemon peltiger (S.Moore) J.W.Green
- Malleostemon pustulatus Rye
- Malleostemon roseus (E.Pritz.) J.W.Green
- Malleostemon tuberculatus (E.Pritz.) J.W.Green
- Malleostemon uniflorus Rye
