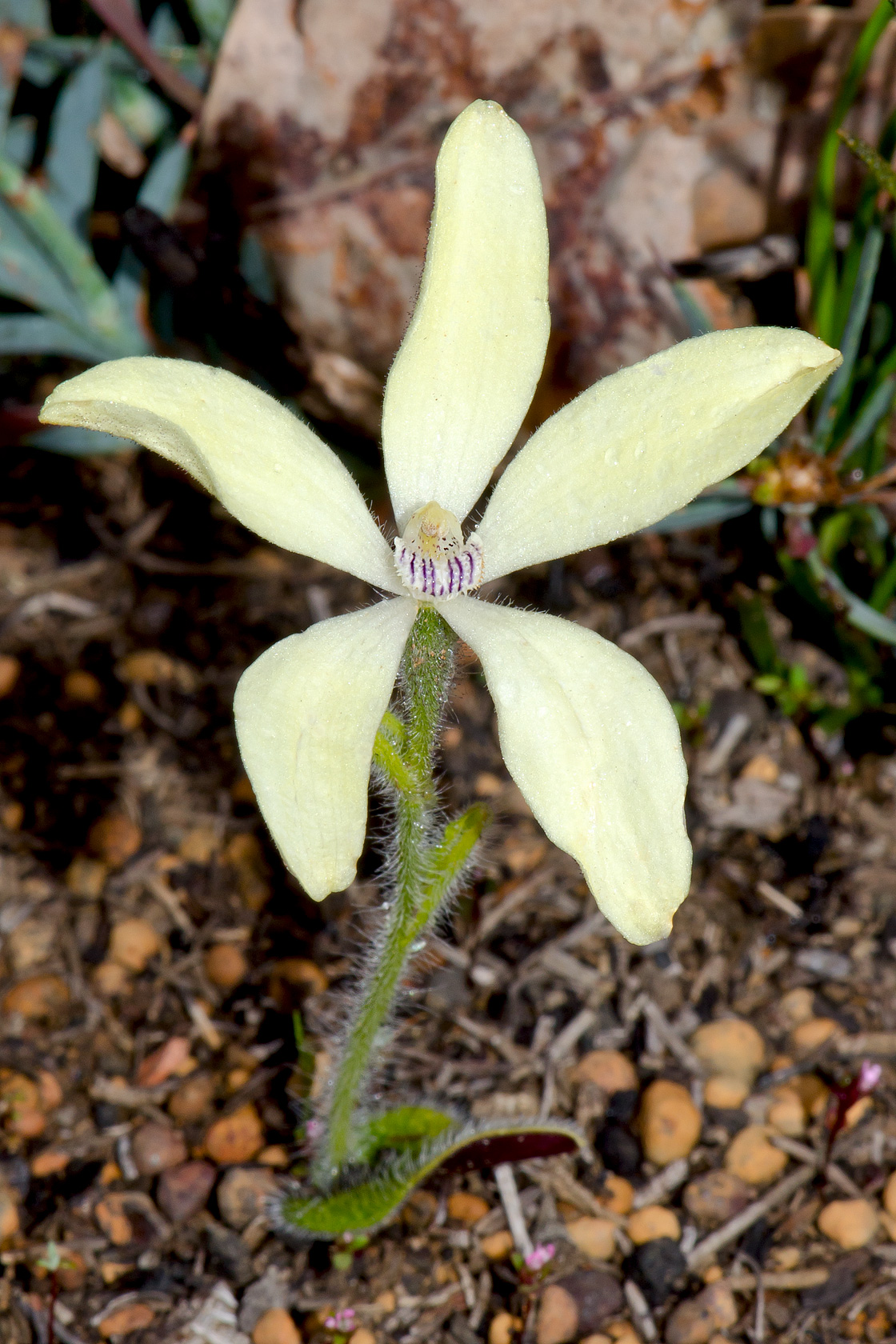
- Cyanicula ixioides growing near Wundowie

Scientific classification
- Kingdom: Plantae
- Clade: Tracheophytes
- Clade: Angiosperms
- Clade: Monocots
- Order: Asparagales
- Family: Orchidaceae
- Subfamily: Orchidoideae
- Tribe: Diurideae
- Genus: Cyanicula
- Species: C. ixioides

Binomial name
- Cyanicula ixioides (Lindl.) Hopper & A.P.Br.

Synonyms
- Caladenia gemmata var. ixioides (Lindl.) Ewart & Jean White; Caladenia ixioides Lindl.; Cyanicula ixioides Paczk. & A.R.Chapm. nom. inval.; Pentisea ixioides (Lindl.) Szlach.

= Cyanicula ixioides =

White china orchid

Species of orchid

Cyanicula ixioides, commonly known as the white china orchid, is a plant in the orchid family Orchidaceae and is endemic to the south-west of Western Australia. It has a single, broad, flattened leaf and up to three yellow or white flowers. It mostly only occurs in woodlands and forest near Perth.

== Description ==
Cyanicula ixioides is a terrestrial, perennial, deciduous, herb with an underground tuber. It has a single flattened leaf, 20–40 mm (0.8–2 in) long, 15–20 mm (0.6–0.8 in) wide and reddish-purple underneath. Up to three white or yellow flowers 30–50 mm (1–2 in) long and wide are borne on a stalk 40–150 mm (2–6 in) tall. The dorsal sepal is erect, 20–25 mm (0.8–1 in) long and 7–8 mm (0.28–0.31 in) wide. The lateral sepals and petals have about the same dimensions as the dorsal sepal. The labellum is 5–9 mm (0.2–0.4 in) long, 3–5 mm (0.1–0.2 in) wide, pale yellow or white with purple stripes. The sides of the labellum have short teeth, the tip curves downwards and there are many rows of short bead-like calli covering the labellum. Flowering occurs from September to October.

== Taxonomy and naming ==
White china orchid was first formally described in 1840 by John Lindley who gave it the name Caladenia ixioides in A Sketch of the Vegetation of the Swan River Colony. In 2000, Stephen Hopper and Andrew Brown transferred the species to Cyanicula as C. ixioides. The specific epithet (ixioides) means "Ixia-like", referring to the flower shape.

== Distribution and habitat ==
Cyanicula ixioides is mostly found between York and Bindoon in the Avon Wheatbelt, Jarrah Forest and Swan Coastal Plain biogeographic regions, growing in forest and woodland under wandoo and jarrah.

== Conservation ==
Cyanicula ixioides is classified as "not threatened" by the Western Australian Government Department of Parks and Wildlife.
