= Malleostemon minilyaensis =

Scientific classification
- Kingdom: Plantae
- Clade: Tracheophytes
- Clade: Angiosperms
- Clade: Eudicots
- Clade: Rosids
- Order: Myrtales
- Family: Myrtaceae
- Genus: Malleostemon
- Species: M. minilyaensis

Binomial name
- Malleostemon minilyaensis J.W.Green

Species of shrub

Malleostemon minilyaensis is a plant species of the family Myrtaceae endemic to Western Australia.

The erect, dense or spreading shrub typically grows to a height of 0.5 to 2.5 metres (2 to 8 ft). It blooms between August and October producing pink-white flowers.

It is found on sandplains or sand dunes in the Gascoyne region of Western Australia between Shark Bay and Carnarvon where it grows in sandy soils.
