= Micromyrtus fimbrisepala =

Scientific classification
- Kingdom: Plantae
- Clade: Tracheophytes
- Clade: Angiosperms
- Clade: Eudicots
- Clade: Rosids
- Order: Myrtales
- Family: Myrtaceae
- Genus: Micromyrtus
- Species: M. fimbrisepala

Binomial name
- Micromyrtus fimbrisepala J.W.Green

Species of shrub

Micromyrtus fimbrisepala is a species of flowering plant in the family Myrtaceae and is endemic to inland Australia. It is a shrub with overlapping, broadly elliptic to more or less round leaves and small pink flowers arranged singly in upper leaf axils.

== Description ==
Micromyrtus fimbrisepala is a shrub that typically grows to a height of up to 0.7 m (2 ft 4 in). Its leaves are overlapping, decussate, broadly elliptic to more or less round, 1.0–2.2 mm (0.039–0.087 in) long, up to 1.5 mm (0.059 in) wide and more or less sessile. The flowers are arranged singly in upper leaf axils on a peduncle 0.5–1.0 mm (0.020–0.039 in) long with 2 bracteoles 1.8 mm (0.071 in) long at the base. The sepals are more or less round, about 2 mm (0.079 in) in diameter and the petals are pink, about 2 mm (0.079 in) in diameter. There are ten stamens, the filaments 0.4 mm (0.016 in) long. Flowering has been observed in February and October.

== Taxonomy ==
Micromyrtus fimbrisepala was first formally described in 1980 by John Green in the journal Nuytsia from specimens collected west of Warburton by Alex George in 1966. The specific epithet (fimbrisepala) means "fringed sepals".

== Distribution and habitat ==
This species grows in on sand dunes in the Gibson Desert in Western Australia, and in the far west of South Australia.
