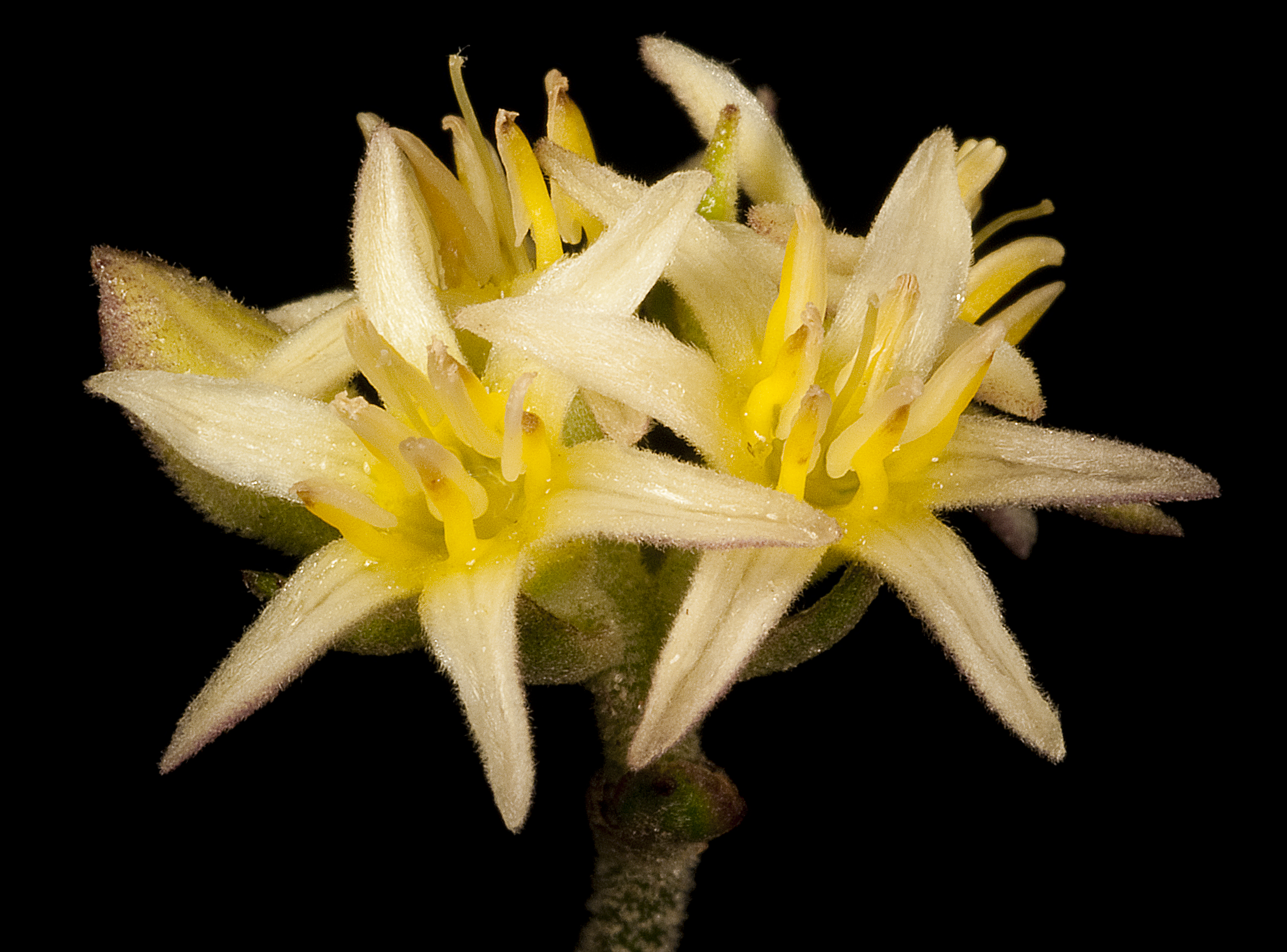
- Subspecies teretifolia near Mt. Benia, near Jurien Bay

Scientific classification
- Kingdom: Plantae
- Clade: Tracheophytes
- Clade: Angiosperms
- Clade: Monocots
- Clade: Commelinids
- Order: Commelinales
- Family: Haemodoraceae
- Genus: Conostylis
- Species: C. teretifolia

Binomial name
- Conostylis teretifolia J.W.Green

= Conostylis teretifolia =

Species of flowering plant

Conostylis teretifolia is a rhizomatous, tufted, perennial, grass-like plant or herb in the family Haemodoraceae and is endemic to the south-west of Western Australia. It has flat leaves, short stems and yellow to reddish, tube-shaped flowers.

== Description ==
Conostylis teretifolia is a rhizomatous, tufted perennial, grass-like plant or herb that typically grows to 6–20 cm (2.4–7.9 in) high. The leaves are flat, 60–120 mm (2.4–4.7 in) long and 0.5–1.1 mm (0.020–0.043 in) wide and grooved with white hairs. The flowers are arranged in heads of a few flowers on a flowering stalk 35–110 mm (1.4–4.3 in) long, sometimes with leaf-like bracts 3–16 mm (0.12–0.63 in) long at the base. The perianth is 7–11 mm (0.28–0.43 in) long with yellow or reddish hairs, and lobes 5–9 mm (0.20–0.35 in) long. The anthers are 1.3–3.2 mm (0.051–0.126 in) long and the style 4–7 mm (0.16–0.28 in) long. Flowering occurs in August and September.

== Taxonomy and naming ==
Conostylis teretifolia was first formally described in 1961 by John Green in the Proceedings of the Linnean Society of New South Wales from a specimen collected by William Blackall near Cockleshell Gully in 1938. The specific epithet (teretifolia) means "terete-leaved".

In 1987, Stephen Hopper described two subspecies of C. teretifolia in the Flora of Australia and the names are accepted by the Australian Plant Census:

- Conostylis teretifolia subsp. planescens Hopper has almost cylindrical to flat leaves, 80–140 mm (3.1–5.5 in) long and 0.5–1 mm (0.020–0.039 in) wide.
- Conostylis teretifolia J.W.Green subsp. teretifolia has terete leaves, 50–130 mm (2.0–5.1 in) long and 0.5–1.1 mm (0.020–0.043 in) wide.

== Distribution and habitat ==
This species of conostylis grows in sand and sandy loam. Subspecies planescens occurs in isolated sites between Gingin, Yanchep and Wanneroo in the Geraldton Sandplains, Jarrah Forest, Swan Coastal Plain bioregions of south-western Western Australia, and subsp. teretifolia in northern heaths between the Moore River and the Arrowsmith River in the Avon Wheatbelt, Geraldton Sandplains and Swan Coastal Plain bioregions.

== Conservation status ==
Both subspecies of Conostylis teretifolia are listed as "not threatened" by the Western Australian Government Department of Biodiversity, Conservation and Attractions.
