= Thryptomene wittweri =

Conservation status
- Declared rare (DEC)

Scientific classification
- Kingdom: Plantae
- Clade: Tracheophytes
- Clade: Angiosperms
- Clade: Eudicots
- Clade: Rosids
- Order: Myrtales
- Family: Myrtaceae
- Genus: Thryptomene
- Species: T. wittweri

Binomial name
- Thryptomene wittweri J.W.Green

Species of shrub

Thryptomene wittweri is a shrub species in the family Myrtaceae that is endemic to Western Australia.

The spreading to rounded shrub typically grows to a height of 0.5 to 1.5 metres (2 to 5 ft). It blooms between April and August producing white-cream flowers.

It is found on breakaways and creek beds in the Gascoyne and Pilbara regions of Western Australia where it grows in skeletal stony soils.
