= Micromyrtus barbata =

Scientific classification
- Kingdom: Plantae
- Clade: Tracheophytes
- Clade: Angiosperms
- Clade: Eudicots
- Clade: Rosids
- Order: Myrtales
- Family: Myrtaceae
- Genus: Micromyrtus
- Species: M. barbata

Binomial name
- Micromyrtus barbata J.W.Green

Species of shrub

Micromyrtus barbata is a species of flowering plant in the family Myrtaceae and is endemic to inland areas of Western Australia. It is a shrub with small, overlapping, narrowly egg-shaped leaves and small white flowers arranged singly in upper leaf axils.

== Description ==
Micromyrtus barbata is a shrub that typically grows to a height of 2.5–7 cm (0.98–2.76 in). Its leaves are arranged in opposite pairs and overlap each other, narrowly egg-shaped with the narrower end towards the base, 1–3 mm (0.039–0.118 in) long and about 0.7 mm (0.028 in) wide. The flowers are arranged singly in upper leaf axils, forming clusters about 7 mm (0.28 in) long, each flower on a peduncle 1.0–1.5 mm (0.039–0.059 in) long with two bracteoles at the base. The sepals are elliptical, about 1.5 mm (0.059 in) in diameter and the petals are white or creamy-white, elliptical and twice as long as the sepals. There are five stamens, the filaments about 1.6 mm (0.063 in) long. Flowering has been recorded in July and September.

== Taxonomy ==
Micromyrtus barbata was first formally described in 1980 by John Green in the journal Nuytsia from specimens collected by Alex George, 104 km (65 mi) south-west of Warburton in the Gibson Desert in 1974. The specific epithet (barbata) means "bearded", referring to the floral tube of this species.

== Distribution and habitat ==
This species of micromyrtus grows in red sand on sandplains and sand dunes in the Gibson Desert, Great Victoria Desert and Little Sandy Desert bioregions of inland Western Australia.

== Conservation status ==
Micromyrtus barbata is classified as "not threatened" by the Government of Western Australia Department of Biodiversity, Conservation and Attractions.
