= Micromyrtus helmsii =

Conservation status
- Priority One — Poorly Known Taxa (DEC)

Scientific classification
- Kingdom: Plantae
- Clade: Tracheophytes
- Clade: Angiosperms
- Clade: Eudicots
- Clade: Rosids
- Order: Myrtales
- Family: Myrtaceae
- Genus: Micromyrtus
- Species: M. helmsii

Binomial name
- Micromyrtus helmsii (F.Muell. & Tate) J.W.Green

Synonyms
- Thryptomene helmsii F.Muell. & Tate

Species of shrub

Micromyrtus helmsii is a species of flowering plant in the myrtle family, Myrtaceae and is endemic to inland areas of Australia. It is a slender, erect or spreading shrub with overlapping, decussate, oblong leaves, and flowers with about 7 stamens, arranged singly in leaf axils.

== Description ==
Micromyrtus helmsii is a slender or spreading shrub that typically grows to a height of 0.9–1.5 m (2 ft 11 in – 4 ft 11 in) and has slender branchlets. Its leaves are overlapping, decussate, oblong, 1.5–3.5 mm (0.059–0.138 in) long and about 1 mm (0.039 in) wide and keeled with several conspicuous oil glands visible on the lower surface. The flowers are arranged singly in leaf axils on a peduncle up to 1.5 mm (0.059 in) long. The sepals are more or less round, 0.8 mm (0.031 in) long and 1 mm (0.039 in) wide and the petals are larger than the sepals and 1.5 mm (0.059 in) in diameter. There are about 7 stamens, the filaments about 0.5 mm (0.020 in) long. Flowering has been recorded in September.

== Taxonomy ==
This species was first formally described in 1896 by Ferdinand von Mueller and Ralph Tate, who gave it the name Thriptomene helmsii in Transactions, proceedings and report, Royal Society of South Australia from specimens collected in the Great Victoria Desert. In 1980, John Green transferred the species to the genus Micromyrtus as M. helmsii. The specific epithet (helmsii) honours Richard Helms.

== Distribution ==
Micromyrtus helmsii is only known from the type location in inland Western Australia.

== Conservation status ==
This species of micromyrtus is listed as "Priority One" by the Western Australian Government Department of Biodiversity, Conservation and Attractions, meaning that it is known from only one or a few locations which are potentially at risk.
