= Malleostemon uniflorus =

Scientific classification
- Kingdom: Plantae
- Clade: Tracheophytes
- Clade: Angiosperms
- Clade: Eudicots
- Clade: Rosids
- Order: Myrtales
- Family: Myrtaceae
- Genus: Malleostemon
- Species: M. uniflorus

Binomial name
- Malleostemon uniflorus Rye

Species of flowering plant

Malleostemon uniflorus is a plant species of the family Myrtaceae endemic to Western Australia.

It is found in an area in the Gascoyne extending into the Mid West region of Western Australia.
