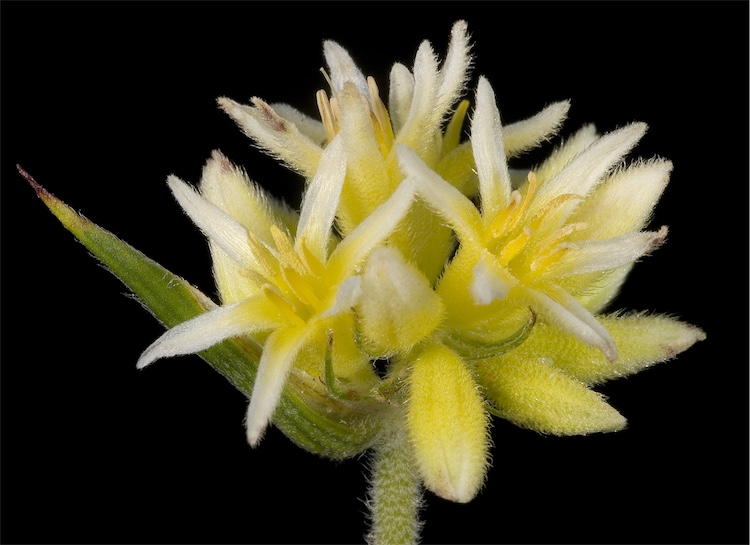
- Subspecies absens near Jurien Bay

Scientific classification
- Kingdom: Plantae
- Clade: Tracheophytes
- Clade: Angiosperms
- Clade: Monocots
- Clade: Commelinids
- Order: Commelinales
- Family: Haemodoraceae
- Genus: Conostylis
- Species: C. crassinerva

Binomial name
- Conostylis crassinerva J.W.Green
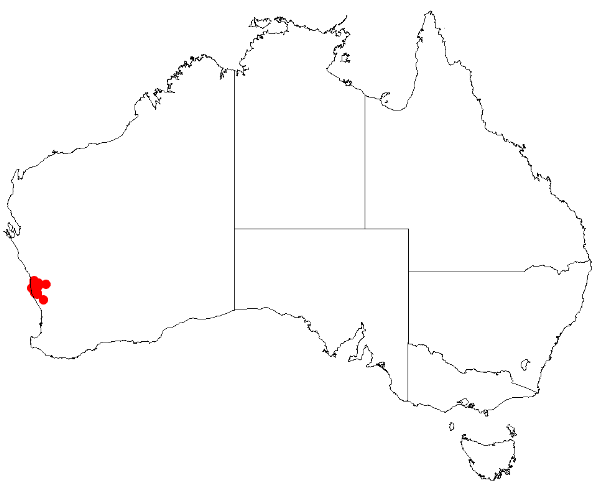
- Occurrence data from AVH

= Conostylis crassinerva =

Species of flowering plant

Conostylis crassinerva is a rhizomatous, tufted perennial, grass-like plant or herb in the family Haemodoraceae and is endemic to the south-west of Western Australia. It has flat leaves and yellow tubular flowers that turn reddish as they age.

== Description ==
Conostylis crassinerva is a rhizomatous, tufted, perennial, grass-like plant or herb up to 15 cm (5.9 in) in diameter. The leaves are flat, 70–180 mm (2.8–7.1 in) long and 1–3 mm (0.039–0.118 in) wide and glabrous or with soft, feather-like hairs. The flowers are arranged in head-like clusters with many flowers on a flowering stalk 40–125 mm (1.6–4.9 in) long with leaf-like bracts at the base of each flower and 4, shorter bracts at the base of the inflorescence. The perianth is yellow, turning reddish as it ages, 7–12 mm (0.28–0.47 in) long with loosely woolly hairs on the outside and shortly woolly-hairy inside. The anthers are about 1 mm (0.039 in) long and the style 5.5–10 mm (0.22–0.39 in) long.

== Taxonomy and naming ==
Conostylis crassinerva was first formally described in 1961 by John Green in the Proceedings of the Linnean Society of New South Wales from a specimen collected on the top of Mount Lesueur. The specific epithet (crassinervia) means "thick-nerved".

In 1987, Stephen Hopper described two subspecies of C. crassinervia and the names are accepted by the Australian Plant Census:

- Conostylis crassinervia subsp. absens Hopper has leaf margins that are not different from the rest of the leaf, with feathery hairs pressed against the surface.
- Conostylis crassinervia J.W.Green subsp. crassinervia has prominent, fibrous, yellowish-brown leaf margins, the rest of the leaf glabrous or with short hairs pressed against the surface.

== Distribution and habitat ==
Subspecies absens is common in heath between the Moore River and the Arrowsmith River in the Geraldton Sandplains, Jarrah Forest and Swan Coastal Plain and subsp. crassinervia is common in heaths between Eneabba and Mount Lesueur in the Geraldton Sandplains and Swan Coastal Plain bioregions of south-western Western Australia.
