= Micromyrtus obovata =

Scientific classification
- Kingdom: Plantae
- Clade: Tracheophytes
- Clade: Angiosperms
- Clade: Eudicots
- Clade: Rosids
- Order: Myrtales
- Family: Myrtaceae
- Genus: Micromyrtus
- Species: M. obovata

Binomial name
- Micromyrtus obovata (Turcz.) J.W.Green

Synonyms
- Micromyrtus drummondii Benth. nom. superfl.; Thryptomene drummondii (Benth.) F.Muell.; Thryptomene obovata Turcz.

Species of shrub

Micromyrtus obovata is a species of the flowering plant in the family Myrtaceae and is endemic to the south-west of Western Australia. It is an erect shrub with egg-shaped leaves with the narrower end toward the base, white flowers 4–5 mm (0.16–0.20 in) in diameter, and 10 stamens in each flower.

== Description ==
Micromyrtus obovata is an erect shrub that typically grows to 0.4–1.6 m (1 ft 4 in – 5 ft 3 in) high and has its leaves densely arranged near the ends of branchlets. Its leaves are erect, egg-shaped to broadly egg-shaped with the narrower end towards the base, 1.5–3.0 mm (0.059–0.118 in) long and 0.8–1.4 mm (0.031–0.055 in) wide on a petiole 0.3–0.5 mm (0.012–0.020 in) long. The flowers are 4–5 mm (0.16–0.20 in) in diameter, and arranged in between 6 and 20 or more upper leaf axils on a peduncle 0.5–1.5 mm (0.020–0.059 in) long. The sepals are egg-shaped or elliptic, 0.4–0.7 mm (0.016–0.028 in) long an 0.5–1 mm (0.020–0.039 in) wide. The petals are white, very broadly egg-shaped with the narrower end towards the base and 1.5–2.0 mm (0.059–0.079 in) long. There are 10 stamens in each flower, the anthers about 0.25 mm (0.0098 in) long. Flowering occurs between July and September, and the fruit is 1.3–1.4 mm (0.051–0.055 in) long and 0.9–1.2 mm (0.035–0.047 in) wide, containing a single golden brown seed.

== Taxonomy ==
This species was first described in 1852 by Nikolai Turczaninow who gave it the name Thryptomene obovata in the Bulletin de la Classe Physico-Mathématique de l'Académie Impériale des Sciences de Saint-Pétersbourg from material collected by James Drummond. In 1985, John Green transferred the species to Micromyrtus as M. obovata . The specific epithet (obovata) means "inverted egg-shaped", referring to the shape of the leaves.

== Distribution and habitat ==
Micromyrtus obovata grows on hills, slopes and flats between Wubin, Lake Grace and Southern Cross in the Avon Wheatbelt, Coolgardie, Esperance Plains, and Mallee bioregions of south-western Western Australia.
