= Malleostemon microphyllus =

Conservation status
- Priority Two — Poorly Known Taxa (DEC)

Scientific classification
- Kingdom: Plantae
- Clade: Tracheophytes
- Clade: Angiosperms
- Clade: Eudicots
- Clade: Rosids
- Order: Myrtales
- Family: Myrtaceae
- Genus: Malleostemon
- Species: M. microphyllus

Binomial name
- Malleostemon microphyllus Rye & Trudgen

Species of flowering plant

Malleostemon microphyllus is a plant species of the family Myrtaceae endemic to Western Australia.

It is found in the Mid West region of Western Australia between Shark Bay and Northampton where it grows in sandy soils.
