= Malleostemon peltiger =

Scientific classification
- Kingdom: Plantae
- Clade: Tracheophytes
- Clade: Angiosperms
- Clade: Eudicots
- Clade: Rosids
- Order: Myrtales
- Family: Myrtaceae
- Genus: Malleostemon
- Species: M. peltiger

Binomial name
- Malleostemon peltiger (S.Moore) J.W.Green

Species of shrub

Malleostemon peltiger is a plant species of the family Myrtaceae endemic to Western Australia.

The straggly spreading shrub typically grows to a height of 0.6 to 2 metres (2 to 7 ft). It blooms between August and November producing pink-white flowers.

It is found on sand plains in the Gascoyne, Mid West and Wheatbelt between Shark Bay and Morawa where it grows in sandy soils.
