= Thryptomene nealensis =

Conservation status
- Priority Three — Poorly Known Taxa (DEC)

Scientific classification
- Kingdom: Plantae
- Clade: Tracheophytes
- Clade: Angiosperms
- Clade: Eudicots
- Clade: Rosids
- Order: Myrtales
- Family: Myrtaceae
- Genus: Thryptomene
- Species: T. nealensis

Binomial name
- Thryptomene nealensis J.W.Green

Species of shrub

Thryptomene nealensis is a species of flowering plant in the family Myrtaceae and is endemic to central areas of Western Australia. It is a shrub with overlapping, decussate, linear leaves and pink flowers with five petals and usually five stamens.

== Description ==
Thryptomene nealensis is a shrub that typically grows a height of 30 cm (12 in). Its leaves are decussate, overlapping, thick, 2–5 mm (0.079–0.197 in) long and about 0.6 mm (0.024 in) wide. The flowers are arranged singly in scattered leaf axils on a slightly flattened peduncle 0.3–0.7 mm (0.012–0.028 in) long. The sepals are more or less round, petal-like and pink, about 1 mm (0.039 in) long, the petals similar to the sepals but slightly longer. There are five, occasionally six stamens. Flowering occurs has been recorded in October.

== Taxonomy ==
Thryptomene nealensis was first formally described in 1980 by John Green in the journal Nuytsia from specimens collected near Neale Junction in the Great Victoria Desert by Alex George in 1966. The specific epithet (nealensis) refers to the type location.

== Distribution and habitat ==
This thryptomene is found on rocky breakaways in the Great Victoria Desert and Murchison biogeographic regions.

== Conservation status ==
Thryptomene nealensis is classified as "Priority Three" by the Government of Western Australia Department of Parks and Wildlife meaning that it is poorly known and known from only a few locations but is not under imminent threat.
