= Malleostemon pedunculatus =

Scientific classification
- Kingdom: Plantae
- Clade: Tracheophytes
- Clade: Angiosperms
- Clade: Eudicots
- Clade: Rosids
- Order: Myrtales
- Family: Myrtaceae
- Genus: Malleostemon
- Species: M. pedunculatus

Binomial name
- Malleostemon pedunculatus J.W.Green

Species of shrub

Malleostemon pedunculatus is a plant species of the family Myrtaceae endemic to Western Australia.

The erect or spreading shrub typically grows to a height of 0.9 to 2 metres (3 to 7 ft). It blooms between August and October producing pink-white flowers.

It is found on sandplains in the Gascoyne region of Western Australia near Shark Bay where it grows in sandy soils.
