= Micromyrtus stenocalyx =

Scientific classification
- Kingdom: Plantae
- Clade: Tracheophytes
- Clade: Angiosperms
- Clade: Eudicots
- Clade: Rosids
- Order: Myrtales
- Family: Myrtaceae
- Genus: Micromyrtus
- Species: M. stenocalyx

Binomial name
- Micromyrtus stenocalyx (F.Muell.) J.W.Green

Species of shrub

Micromyrtus stenocalyx is a species of flowering plant in the family Myrtaceae and is endemic to the inland of Western Australia. It is a straggly or widely spreading shrub with oblong or club-shaped leaves pressed against the stem, and cream-coloured to yellow flowers with 10 stamens.

== Description ==
Micromyrtus stenocalyx is a straggly or widely spreading shrub that typically grows to a height of 0.8–1 m (2 ft 7 in – 3 ft 3 in). Its leaves are oblong or club-shaped and more or less pressed against the stem, 1.0–3.5 mm (0.039–0.138 in) long on a petiole about 0.3 mm (0.012 in) long with a few oil glands on the lower surface. The flowers are arranged singly in leaf axils and are 4–5 mm (0.16–0.20 in) long on a peduncle about 0.7 mm (0.028 in) long. The floral tube is cylindrical and about 3 mm (0.12 in) long, the sepals less than 0.3 mm (0.012 in) long and 0.5 mm (0.020 in) wide and the petals are cream-coloured to yellow, about 1 mm (0.039 in) long with several oil glands. Flowering has been recorded July to November.

== Taxonomy ==
This species was first formally described in 1876 by Ferdinand von Mueller who gave it the name Thryptomene stenocalyx in his Fragmenta Phytographiae Australiae from specimens collected at Queen Victoria Spring by Jess Young. In 1980, John Green transferred the species to Micromyrtus as M. stenocalyx in the journal Nuytsia. The specific epithet (stenocalyx) means "narrow calyx".

== Distribution and habitat ==
Micromyrtus stenocalyx grows on sand dunes and sandplains in the Coolgardie, Great Victoria Desert and Murchison bioregions of inland Western Australia.

== Conservation status ==
Thie species of micromyrtus is listed as "not threatened" by the Western Australian Government Department of Biodiversity, Conservation and Attractions.
