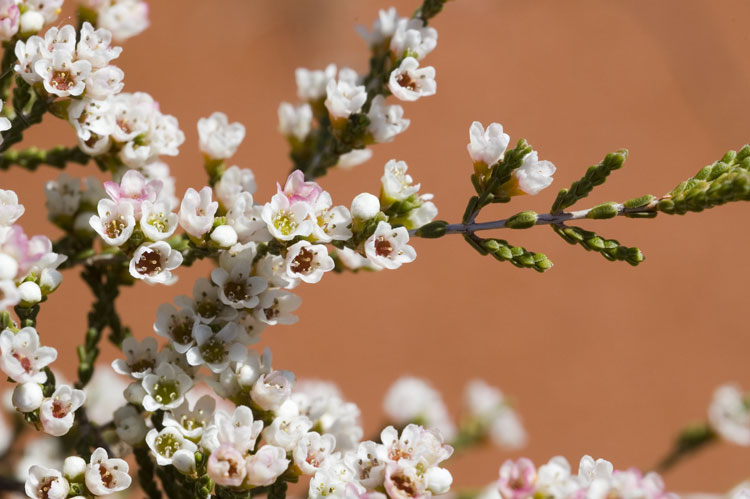
- In Nombinnie Nature Reserve

Scientific classification
- Kingdom: Plantae
- Clade: Tracheophytes
- Clade: Angiosperms
- Clade: Eudicots
- Clade: Rosids
- Order: Myrtales
- Family: Myrtaceae
- Genus: Micromyrtus
- Species: M. striata

Binomial name
- Micromyrtus striata J.W.Green

= Micromyrtus striata =

Species of shrub

Micromyrtus striata is a species of flowering plant in the myrtle family, Myrtaceae and is endemic to eastern Australia. It is an erect to spreading shrub with overlapping egg-shaped leaves, and white to pinkish flowers arranged singly in upper leaf axils.

== Description ==
Micromyrtus striata is an erect to spreading shrub growing to 1.2 m (3 ft 11 in) high and wide. The leaves are overlapping, egg-shaped to lance-shaped with the narrower end towards the base, 1.2–2.6 mm (0.047–0.102 in) long 0.7–1.2 mm (0.028–0.047 in) wide and sessile or with a petiole up to 0.2 mm (0.0079 in) long. The leaves are glabrous with prominent oil glands. The flowers are about 2 mm (0.079 in) in diameter and arranged singly in leaf axils on a peduncle up to 0.3 mm (0.012 in) long with 2 bracteoles 1.2 mm (0.047 in) long at the base. The floral cup is 1.2–1.6 mm (0.047–0.063 in) long with 7 to 9 ribs. The 5 sepals lobes are 0.5–0.8 mm (0.020–0.031 in) long and the 5 petals are white to pinkish, circular to elliptic in shape and 0.8–1.7 mm (0.031–0.067 in) long and 0.6–1.3 mm (0.024–0.051 in) wide. There are five stamens about 1.0 mm (0.039 in) long and the style is about 1.0 mm (0.039 in) lonh. Flowering has been observed in September and October.

== Taxonomy and naming ==
Micromyrtus striata was first formally described in 1983 by John Green from a specimen collected near Tottenham and the description was published in the journal Nuytsia. The specific epithet (striata) refers to the prominent ribs on the floral tube.

== Distribution and habitat ==
This species is widespread and common and grows in mallee, heath and woodland near Inglewood in southern Queensland and from Bourke to Griffith in New South Wales.
