= Malleostemon decipiens =

Conservation status
- Priority One — Poorly Known Taxa (DEC)

Scientific classification
- Kingdom: Plantae
- Clade: Tracheophytes
- Clade: Angiosperms
- Clade: Eudicots
- Clade: Rosids
- Order: Myrtales
- Family: Myrtaceae
- Genus: Malleostemon
- Species: M. decipiens

Binomial name
- Malleostemon decipiens (W.Fitzg.) Trudgen

Species of flowering plant

Malleostemon decipiens is a plant species of the family Myrtaceae endemic to Western Australia.

It is found in the Wheatbelt region of Western Australia between Mingenew, Morawa and Three Springs where it grows in sandy soils.
