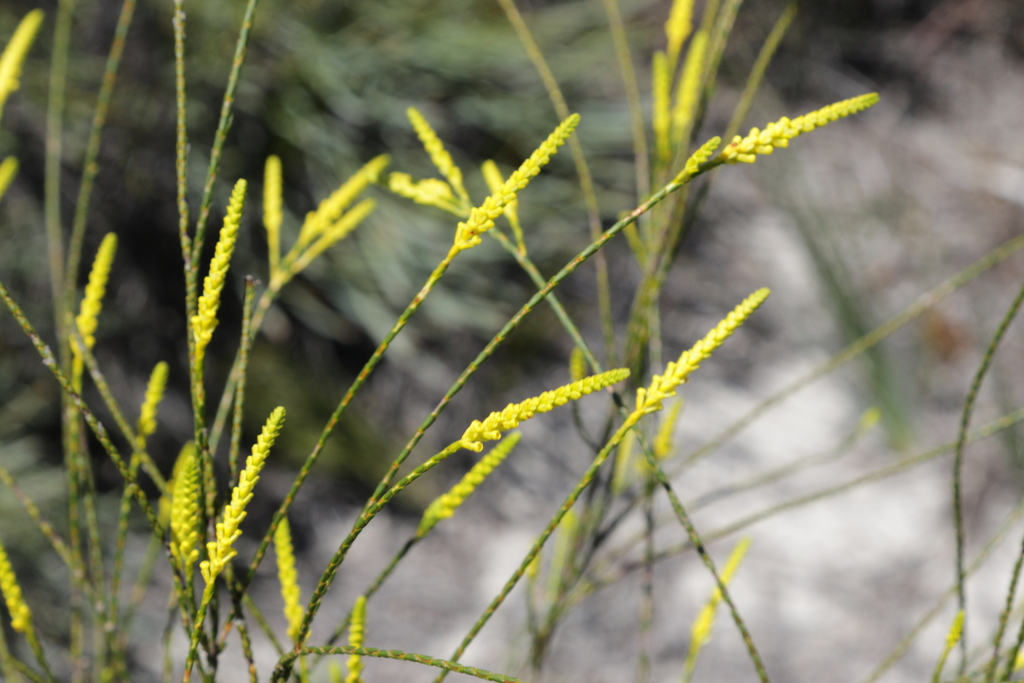
- Near Warradarge

Scientific classification
- Kingdom: Plantae
- Clade: Tracheophytes
- Clade: Angiosperms
- Clade: Eudicots
- Clade: Rosids
- Order: Myrtales
- Family: Myrtaceae
- Genus: Micromyrtus
- Species: M. flava

Binomial name
- Micromyrtus flava (J.W.Green) Rye & Peter G.Wilson

Synonyms
- Corynanthera flava J.W.Green (1979)

= Micromyrtus flava =

Species of shrub

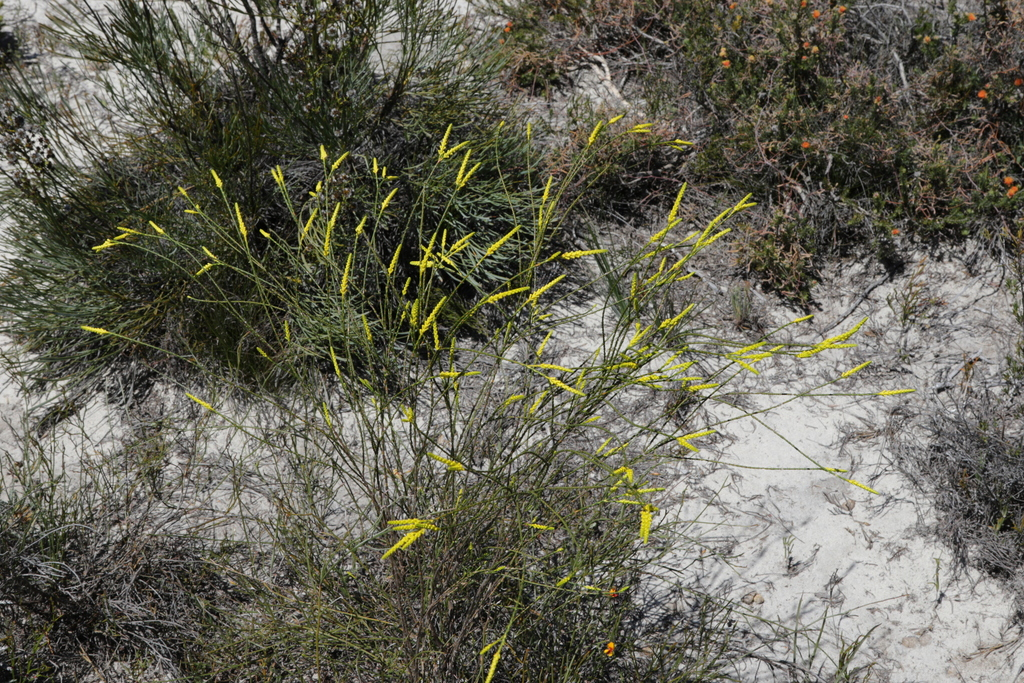
Habit

Micromyrtus flava is a species of flowering plant in the family Myrtaceae and is endemic to the south-west of Western Australia. It is a slender, erect shrub with spreading stems, narrowly-elliptic leaves and yellow flowers.

== Description ==
Micromyrtus flava is a slender, erect shrub that typically grows to a height of 0.3–1.75 m (1 ft 0 in – 5 ft 9 in) and has a few stems near the base spread above, with the leaves mostly only on the upper branches. Its leaves are narrowly elliptic, 1.5–4 mm (0.059–0.157 in) long, sessile and pressed against the stems with prominent oil glands. The flowers are sessile, 2.5–3.0 mm (0.098–0.118 in) long arranged along a spike 20–70 mm (0.79–2.76 in) long with bracteoles as long as the floral tube. The floral tube is narrowly triangular, the surface with many small, pale yellow oil glands. The sepals are about 0.5 mm (0.020 in) in long and the petals are yellow, about 1.5 mm (0.059 in) long. Flowering occurs from September to February.

== Taxonomy ==
This species was first formally described in 1979 by John Green who gave it the name Corynanthera flava in the journal Nuytsia from specimens he collected west of Winchester in 1978. In 2022, Barbara Rye and Peter Gordon Wilson transferred the species to Micromyrtus as Micromyrtus flava. The specific epithet (flava) means "yellow".

== Distribution and habitat ==
Micromyrtus flava grows in heath and shrubland between the Tathra National Park and Watheroo National Park in the Geraldton Sandplains and Swan Coastal Plain bioregions of south-western Western Australia.
