= Thryptomene longifolia =

Scientific classification
- Kingdom: Plantae
- Clade: Tracheophytes
- Clade: Angiosperms
- Clade: Eudicots
- Clade: Rosids
- Order: Myrtales
- Family: Myrtaceae
- Genus: Thryptomene
- Species: T. longifolia

Binomial name
- Thryptomene longifolia J.W.Green

Species of flowering plant

Thryptomene longifolia is a species of flowering plant in the family Myrtaceae and is endemic to inland areas of South Australia. It is a shrub with more or less needle-shaped leaves and pink flowers with five to eight petals and five to eight stamens.

== Description ==
Thryptomene longifolia is shrub that typically grows to a height of up to 2 m (6 ft 7 in). Its leaves are more or less cylindrical, 3–4 mm (0.12–0.16 in) long with a hooked tip, on a petiole about 1 mm (0.039 in) long. The flowers are scattered along the branchlets singly or in groups of up to three on a peduncle about 1 mm (0.039 in) long. The floral cup has five longitudinal ridges and the sepals are more or less round, pink, and about 1 mm (0.039 in) long. The petals are also pink, elliptical, about the same length as the sepals and there are five to eight stamens. Flowering occurs around May.

== Taxonomy ==
Thryptomene longifolia was first formally described in 1986 by John Green in the Flora of South Australia from specimens collected by T.R. Lothian near Tallaringa Well in 1967. The specific epithet (longifolia) means "long-leaved".

== Distribution and habitat ==
This thryptomene grows on red sand dunes in the north of South Australia.
