= Thryptomene decussata =

Scientific classification
- Kingdom: Plantae
- Clade: Tracheophytes
- Clade: Angiosperms
- Clade: Eudicots
- Clade: Rosids
- Order: Myrtales
- Family: Myrtaceae
- Genus: Thryptomene
- Species: T. decussata

Binomial name
- Thryptomene decussata (W.Fitzg.) J.W.Green

Synonyms
- Scholtzia decussata W.Fitzg.

Species of shrub

Thryptomene decussata is a species of flowering plant in the family Myrtaceae and is endemic to Western Australia. It is an erect shrub with upward-pointing, egg-shaped leaves and white or pink flowers with five petals and twenty to thirty stamens in two whorls.

== Description ==
Thryptomene decussata is an erect, open shrub that typically grows to a height of 0.6–3 m (2 ft 0 in – 9 ft 10 in), often with large galls on the stems and flowers. Its leaves are pointed upwards and broadly egg-shaped with the narrower end towards the base, 1.3–2.3 mm (0.051–0.091 in) long and 1.3–2.7 mm (0.051–0.106 in) wide on a petiole 0.1–0.3 mm (0.0039–0.0118 in) long. The flowers are arranged in pairs in up to three adjacent leaf axils, on peduncles about 0.2 mm (0.0079 in) long with bracteoles 2–3.3 mm (0.079–0.130 in) long that remain until the fruit falls. The flowers are 7.5–9.5 mm (0.30–0.37 in) in diameter and cup-shaped with egg-shaped, pinkish sepals 2.2–3.3 mm (0.087–0.130 in) long and 3.3–4.4 mm (0.13–0.17 in) wide. The petals are pink, 2.5–3.5 mm (0.098–0.138 in) long and there are twenty to thirty stamens in two whorls, some with filaments up to 3.3 mm (0.13 in) long. Flowering occurs from May to November.

== Taxonomy ==
This species was first formally described in 1904 by William Vincent Fitzgerald who gave it the name Scholtzia decussata in the Journal of the West Australian Natural History Society. In 1985, John Green changed the name to Thryptomene decussata. The specific epithet (decussata) refers to the decussate arrangement of the leaves.

== Distribution and habitat ==
This thryptomene is widely distributed from near Shark Bay to near Leonora, growing on sand plains, breakaways and on stony ridges in the Coolgardie, Gascoyne, Murchison and Yalgoo biogeographic regions.

== Conservation status ==
Thryptomene decussata is classified as "not threatened" by the Western Australian Government Department of Parks and Wildlife.
