= John Green (botanist) =

Australian botanist (born 1930)

John William Green
- Born: 10 July 1930 (age 96); Waverley, New South Wales, Australia
- Citizenship: Australian
- Known for: his plant taxa publications
- Scientific career
- Fields: Botany
- Workplaces: Western Australian Herbarium; University of New England; Forest Research Institute; Western Australian Herbarium
- Author abbrev. (botany): J.W.Green

John William Green (born 10 July 1930) is an Australian botanist.

== Career ==
Green began his botanical career in 1954 as assistant botanist in the Western Australian Herbarium. He remained in that position until 1958, in his final year serving as botanical adviser to phytochemical surveys in the southwest. He then took up a position at the University of New England at Armidale, New South Wales until 1963, when he moved to Canberra, initially as an academic, and after 1966 as a researcher at the Forest Research Institute. In 1970 he moved to Ontario, Canada, taking up a post as professor at the Laurentian University.

In 1975, Green returned to Australia, taking on the post of curator to the Western Australian Herbarium. He held that position until 1987. During this time he oversaw the introduction of database systems for management of collections.

== Plant taxa publications ==
Green has published a number of plant taxa, among which the following are still current:

- Tersonia cyathiflora
- Conostylis aculeata subsp. rhipidion
- Conostylis argentea
- Conostylis crassinerva
- Conostylis deplexa
- Conostylis teretifolia
- Corynanthera
- Corynanthera flava
- Malleostemon
- Malleostemon hursthousei
- Malleostemon minilyaensis
- Malleostemon pedunculatus
- Malleostemon peltiger
- Malleostemon roseus
- Malleostemon tuberculatus
- Micromyrtus barbata
- Micromyrtus blakelyi
- Micromyrtus fimbrisepala
- Micromyrtus helmsii
- Micromyrtus obovata
- Micromyrtus serrulata
- Micromyrtus sessilis
- Micromyrtus striata
- Micromyrtus stenocalyx
- Thryptomene biseriata
- Thryptomene cuspidata
- Thryptomene decussata
- Thryptomene longifolia
- Thryptomene naviculata
- Thryptomene nealensis
- Thryptomene wittweri

He was also collector of the type specimen of Eucalyptus dolichorhyncha.

== Sources ==
- Hall, Norman (1978). Botanists of the Eucalypts. Australia: Commonwealth Scientific and Industrial Research Organization. ISBN 0-643-00271-5.
- "Green, John W. (1930 – )". Australian National Botanic Gardens.
- John Green. "Search for 'J.W.Green'". International Plant Names Index (IPNI). Royal Botanic Gardens, Kew; Harvard University Herbaria & Libraries; Australian National Botanic Gardens.
