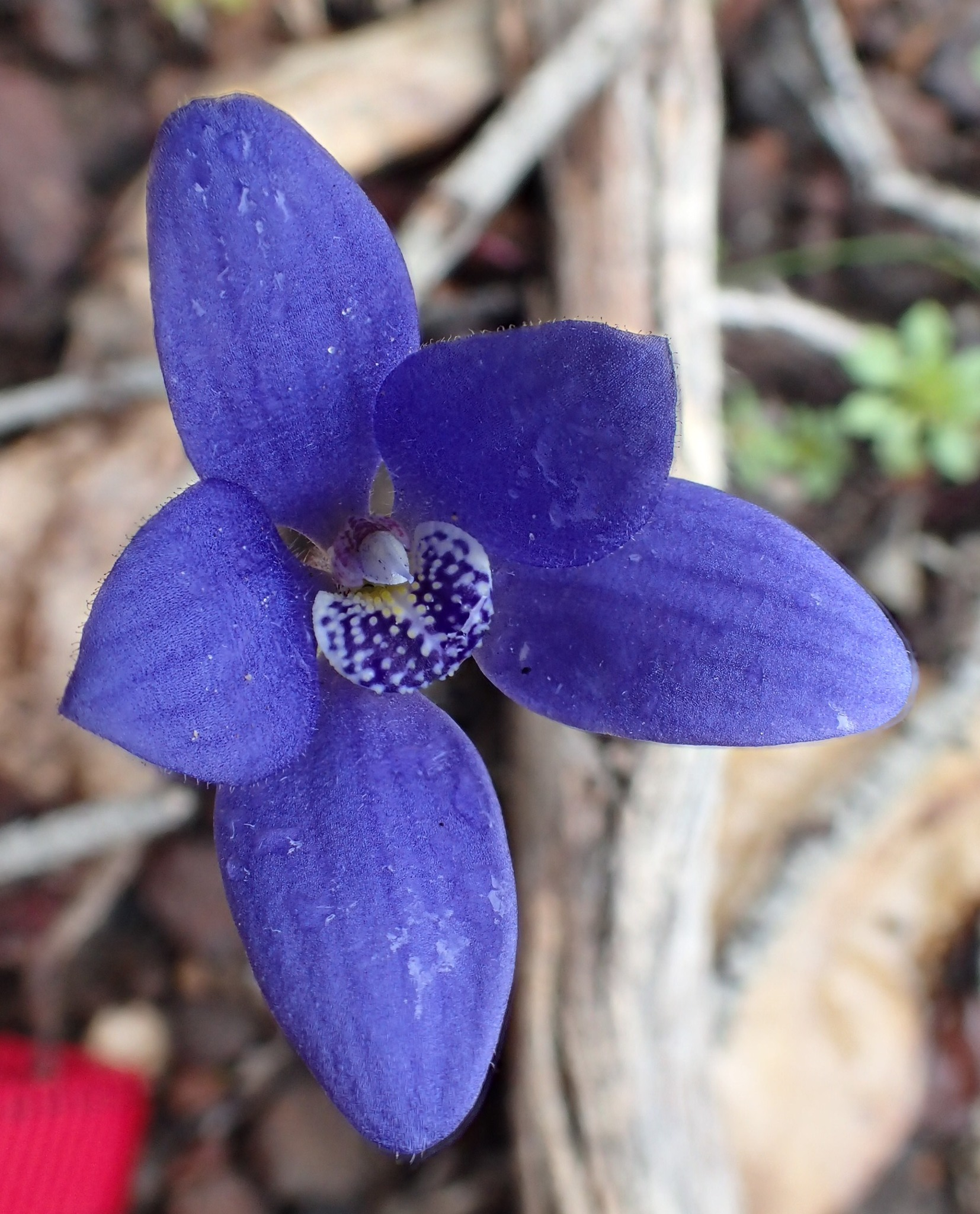
- In a Perth suburb

Scientific classification
- Kingdom: Plantae
- Clade: Embryophytes
- Clade: Tracheophytes
- Clade: Spermatophytes
- Clade: Angiosperms
- Clade: Monocots
- Order: Asparagales
- Family: Orchidaceae
- Subfamily: Orchidoideae
- Tribe: Diurideae
- Genus: Cyanicula
- Species: C. gemmata

Binomial name
- Cyanicula gemmata (Lindl.) Hopper & A.B.Br.

Synonyms
- Caladenia gemmata Lindl.; Caladenia gemmata Lindl. f. gemmata; Caladenia gemmata Lindl. var. gemmata; Caladenia pellita Endl.; Cyanicula gemmata N.Hoffman & A.P.Br. nom. inval.; Cyanicula gemmata Paczk. & A.R.Chapm. nom. inval.; Cyanicula gertrudiae N.Hoffman & A.P.Br. nom. inval.; Pentisea gemmata (Lindl.) Szlach.

= Cyanicula gemmata =

Blue china orchid

Species of orchid

Cyanicula gemmata, commonly known as the blue china orchid, is a plant in the orchid family Orchidaceae and is endemic to the south-west of Western Australia. It has a small, oval leaf and up to three intense blue to mauve flowers. It is the most common and widespread of the West Australian china orchids, sometimes appearing in large numbers after summer fires.

== Description ==
Cyanicula gemmata is a terrestrial, perennial, deciduous, herb with an underground tuber. It has a single dark green, shiny leaf, 20–40 mm (0.8–2 in) long, 10–20 mm (0.4–0.8 in) wide and purplish underneath. Up to three intense blue to purplish flowers 20–50 mm (0.8–2 in) long and wide are borne on a stalk 40–150 mm (2–6 in) tall. The dorsal sepal is erect, 20–30 mm (0.8–1 in) long and 5–10 mm (0.2–0.4 in) wide. The lateral sepals and petals have about the same dimensions as the dorsal sepal. The labellum is 5–8 mm (0.2–0.3 in) long, 5–7 mm (0.2–0.3 in) wide, purple and blue and curves downward near its tip. There are many scattered small, bead-like calli covering the labellum. Flowering occurs from August to early November.

== Taxonomy and naming ==
The blue china orchid was first formally described in 1840 by John Lindley who gave it the name Caladenia gemmata in A Sketch of the Vegetation of the Swan River Colony. In 2000, Stephen Hopper and Andrew Brown transferred the species to Cyanicula as C. gemmata. The specific epithet (gemmata) is a Latin word meaning "jewelled", referring to the labellum calli.

== Distribution and habitat ==
Cyanicula gemmata is a common and widespread china orchid found between Kalbarri in the north and Israelite Bay in the east, growing in a range of habitats from heath to forest. Plants growing in wetter areas tend to flower more profusely after summer fires.

== Conservation ==
Cyanicula gemmata is classified as "not threatened" by the Western Australian Government Department of Parks and Wildlife.
