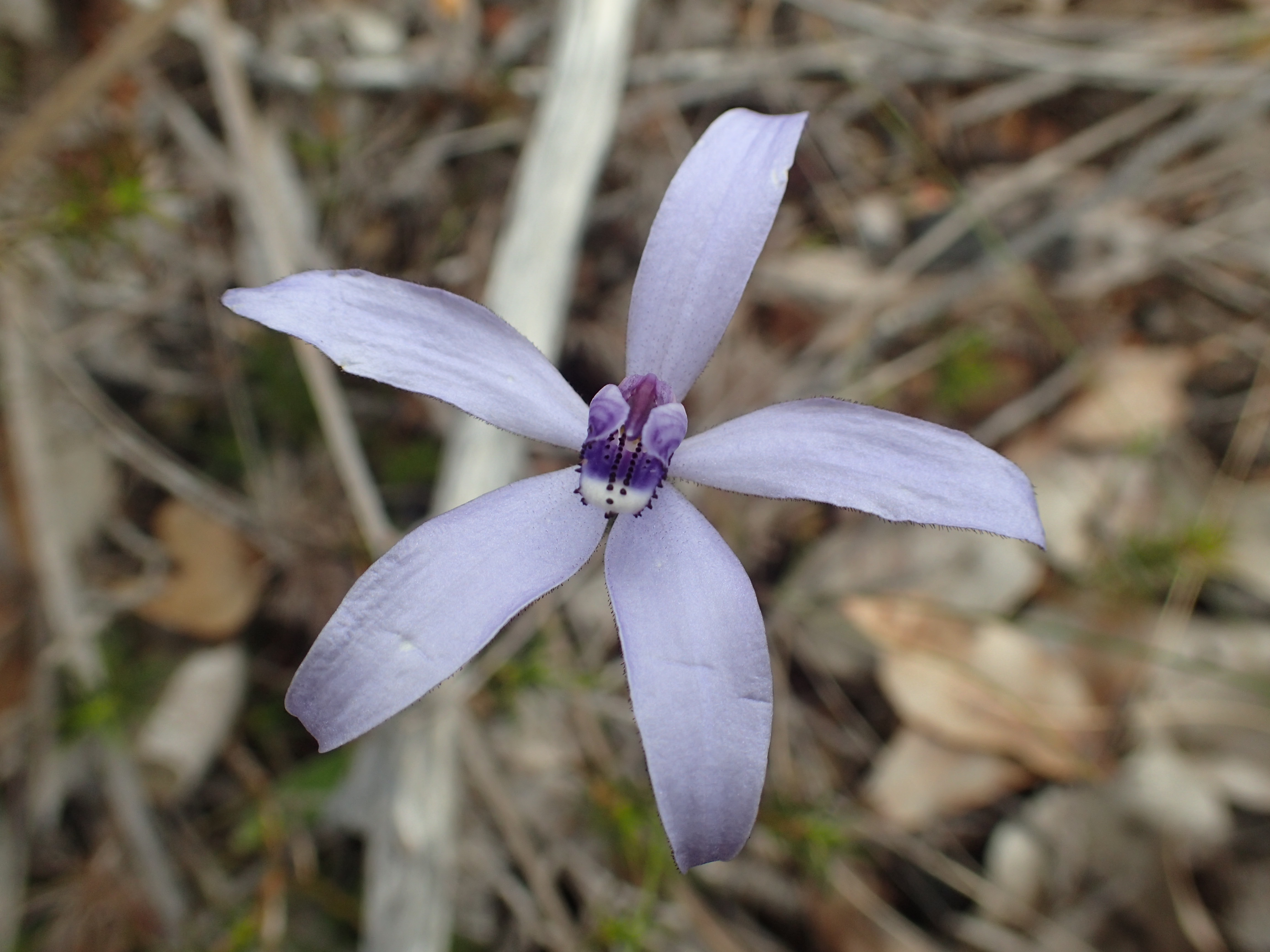
- In Mount Barker, Western Australia

Scientific classification
- Kingdom: Plantae
- Clade: Embryophytes
- Clade: Tracheophytes
- Clade: Spermatophytes
- Clade: Angiosperms
- Clade: Monocots
- Order: Asparagales
- Family: Orchidaceae
- Subfamily: Orchidoideae
- Tribe: Diurideae
- Genus: Cyanicula
- Species: C. sericea

Binomial name
- Cyanicula sericea (Lindl) Hopper & A.P.Br.

Synonyms
- Caladenia sericea Lindl.; Cyanicula sericea N.Hoffman & A.P.Br. nom. inval.; Cyanicula sericea Paczk. & A.R.Chapm. nom. inval.; Pentisea sericea (Lindl.) Szlach.

= Cyanicula sericea =

Silky blue orchid

Species of orchid endemic to Australia

Cyanicula sericea, commonly known as the silky blue orchid, is a plant in the orchid family Orchidaceae and is endemic to the south-west of Western Australia. It is a common orchid in the high rainfall areas of the state and has a single, broad, silky leaf and up to four blue-mauve flowers.

== Description ==
Cyanicula sericea is a terrestrial, perennial, deciduous, herb with an underground tuber and a single soft, densely silky leaf, 50–120 mm (2–5 in) long and about 20 mm (0.8 in) wide. Up to four pale blue or mauve flowers 30–50 mm (1–2 in) long and 30–40 mm (1–2 in) wide are borne on a stalk 150–400 mm (6–20 in) tall. The dorsal sepal is erect, 20–30 mm (0.8–1 in) long and 5–8 mm (0.2–0.3 in) wide. The lateral sepals and petals have about the same dimensions as the dorsal sepal. The labellum is 10–15 mm (0.4–0.6 in) long, 7–10 mm (0.3–0.4 in) wide and spotted with purple. The sides of the labellum curve upwards to surround the column, and the short tip curls downward with short teeth on its sides. There are four or six rows of purple calli along the mid-line of the labellum. Flowering occurs from August to early October and is much more prolific after summer fires.

== Taxonomy and naming ==
Silky blue orchid was first formally described in 1840 by John Lindley in his A Sketch of the Vegetation of the Swan River Colony. In 2000, Stephen Hopper and Andrew Brown changed the name to Cyanicula sericea. The specific epithet (sericea) is a Latin word meaning "silken" or "silky", referring to the soft, silky leaf of this species.

== Distribution and habitat ==
Cyanicula sericea occurs in the higher rainfall areas of Western Australia between Jurien Bay in the north and Esperance in the east, in the Avon Wheatbelt, Esperance Plains, Jarrah Forest, Swan Coastal Plain and Warren biogeographic regions, growing in forest, woodland and on granite outcrops.

== Conservation ==
Cyanicula sericea is classified as "not threatened" by the Western Australian Government Department of Parks and Wildlife.
