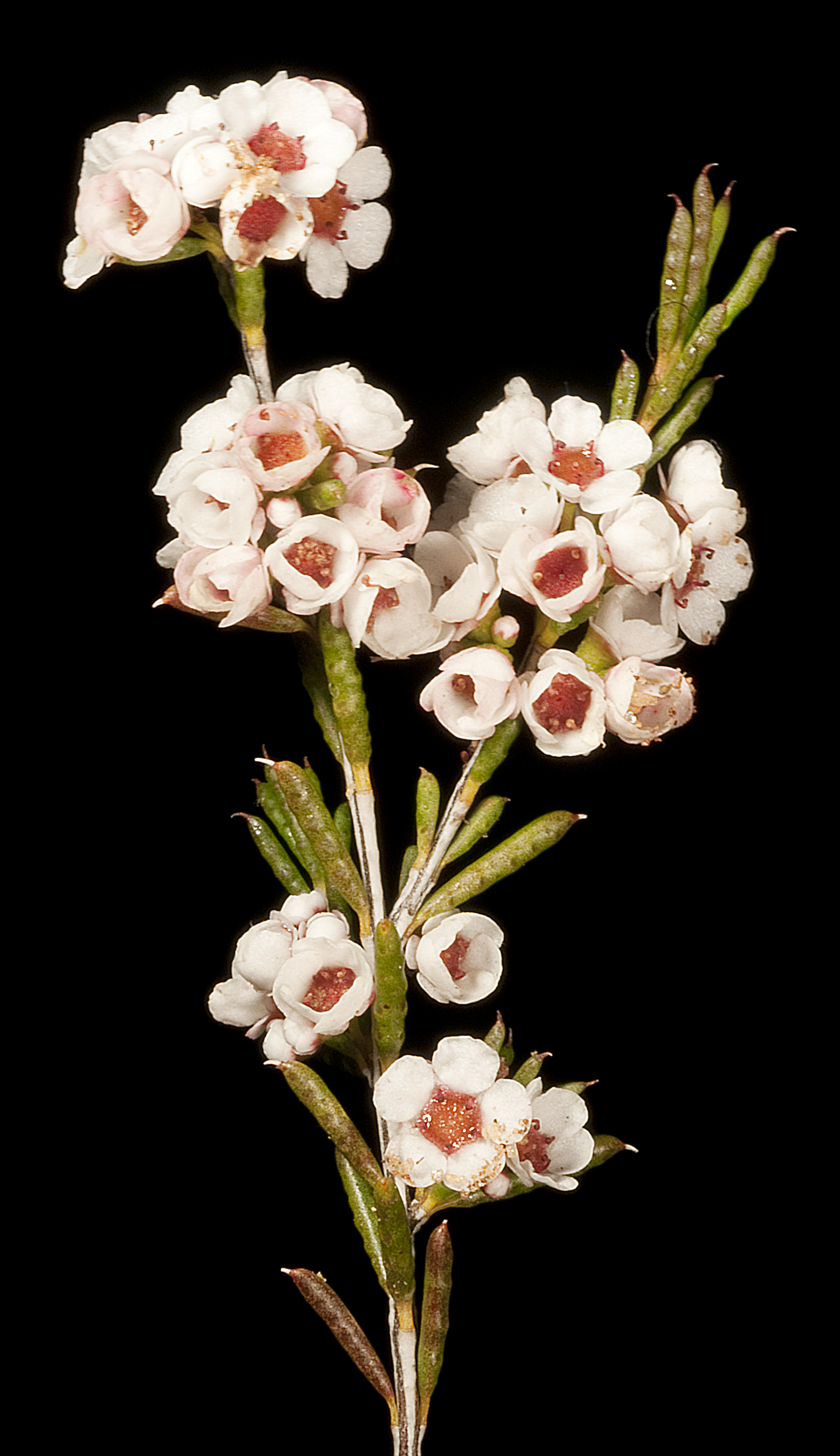

Scientific classification
- Kingdom: Plantae
- Clade: Tracheophytes
- Clade: Angiosperms
- Clade: Eudicots
- Clade: Rosids
- Order: Myrtales
- Family: Myrtaceae
- Genus: Malleostemon
- Species: M. tuberculatus

Binomial name
- Malleostemon tuberculatus (E.Pritz.) J.W.Green

= Malleostemon tuberculatus =

Species of shrub

Malleostemon tuberculatus is a plant species of the family Myrtaceae endemic to Western Australia.

The erect slender shrub typically grows to a height of 0.6 to 2.5 metres (2.0 to 8.2 ft). It blooms between July and November producing pink-white flowers.

It is found on sand plains and among granite outcrops in an area in the extending from the Mid West into the Wheatbelt and Goldfields-Esperance regions of Western Australia where it grows in sandy or clay or loamy soils sometimes over laterite.
