= Thryptomene duplicata =

Conservation status
- Priority One — Poorly Known Taxa (DEC)

Scientific classification
- Kingdom: Plantae
- Clade: Tracheophytes
- Clade: Angiosperms
- Clade: Eudicots
- Clade: Rosids
- Order: Myrtales
- Family: Myrtaceae
- Genus: Thryptomene
- Species: T. duplicata

Binomial name
- Thryptomene duplicata Rye & Trudgen

Species of shrub

Thryptomene duplicata is a species of flowering plant in the family Myrtaceae and is endemic to Western Australia. It is a spreading shrub with upward pointing, egg-shaped leaves with the narrower end towards the base, and white flowers with five petals and about fifteen stamens in two whorls.

== Description ==
Thryptomene duplicata is a spreading shrub that typically grows to about 0.8 m (2 ft 7 in) high and 2 m (6 ft 7 in) wide. Its leaves are pointed upwards, overlapping each other and egg-shaped with the narrower end towards the base, about 2.6 mm (0.10 in) long and 2.5–3.5 mm (0.098–0.138 in) wide on a petiole up to 1.0 mm (0.039 in) long. The flowers are arranged in pairs or threes on peduncles 0.7–1.4 mm (0.028–0.055 in) long with egg-shaped bracteoles about 2 mm (0.079 in) long that persist until the fruit falls. The flowers are about 6 mm (0.24 in) in diameter with egg-shaped sepals about 1.4 mm (0.055 in) long, with the narrower end towards the base. The petals are white, about 2 mm (0.079 in) long with minute teeth on the edges, and there are about fifteen stamens arranged in two whorls. Flowering occurs around December.

== Taxonomy ==
Thryptomene duplicata was first formally described in 2001 by Barbara Lynette Rye and Malcolm Eric Trudgen in the journal Nuytsia from specimens collected by Trudgen near Binnu in 1993. The specific epithet (duplicata) means "doubled", referring to the number of stamens compared to that of other thryptomenes.

== Distribution and habitat ==
This thryptomene is only known from a single population near Binnu where it grows in sandy soil in open shrubland.

== Conservation status ==
Thryptomene duplicata is classified as "Priority One" by the Government of Western Australia Department of Parks and Wildlife, meaning that it is known from only one or a few locations that are potentially at risk.
