= Thryptomene repens =

Conservation status
- Priority Two — Poorly Known Taxa (DEC)

Scientific classification
- Kingdom: Plantae
- Clade: Tracheophytes
- Clade: Angiosperms
- Clade: Eudicots
- Clade: Rosids
- Order: Myrtales
- Family: Myrtaceae
- Genus: Thryptomene
- Species: T. repens

Binomial name
- Thryptomene repens Rye & Trudgen

Species of shrub

Thryptomene repens is a species of flowering plant in the family Myrtaceae and is endemic to a restricted area in the west of Western Australia. It is a prostrate shrub with egg-shaped leaves with the narrower end towards the base, and flowers with pink sepals and petals and ten stamens.

== Description ==
Thryptomene repens is a prostrate, widely-spreading shrub that forms roots at the nodes. Its leaves are upward-curved, crowded, and egg-shaped with the narrower end towards the base, 2.5–3 mm (0.098–0.118 in) long and 0.6–1.3 mm (0.024–0.051 in) wide on a petiole 0.2–0.4 mm (0.0079–0.0157 in) long. The flowers are arranged in short racemes of between two and seven pairs of flowers on a peduncle 1.5–2.5 mm (0.059–0.098 in) long with leaf-like bracteoles 1.1–1.4 mm (0.043–0.055 in) long that fall as the flower develops. The flowers are about 3 mm (0.12 in) wide with deep pink, sepals 0.6–1.0 mm (0.024–0.039 in) long and about 0.6 mm (0.024 in) wide with a prominent keel. The petals are pink, about 1.5 mm (0.059 in) long and there are ten stamens. Flowering occurs from August to September.

== Taxonomy ==
Thryptomene repens was first formally described in 2014 by Barbara Lynette Rye and Malcolm Eric Trudgen in the journal Nuytsia from specimens collected by Alex George on Dirk Hartog Island in 1972. The specific epithet (repens) means "creeping", referring to the prostrate habit of this species.

== Distribution and habitat ==
This thryptomene grows in coastal habitats on Dirk Hartog Island and at Steep Point, the most westerly point of the Australian mainland.

== Conservation status ==
Thryptomene repens is classified as "Priority Two" by the Western Australian Government Department of Parks and Wildlife meaning that it is poorly known and from only one or a few locations.
