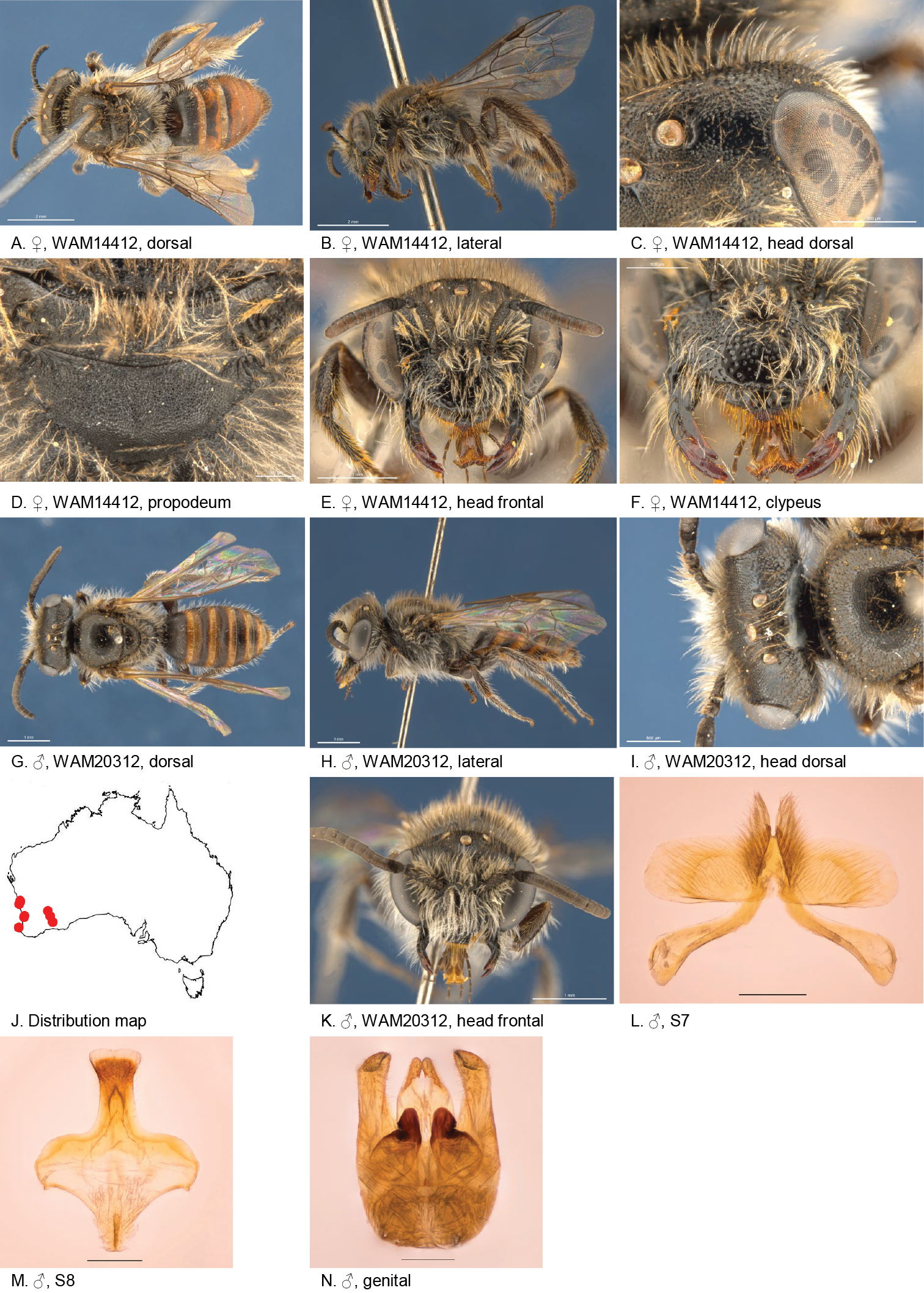
- Female holotype and male allotype

Scientific classification
- Kingdom: Animalia
- Phylum: Arthropoda
- Clade: Pancrustacea
- Class: Insecta
- Order: Hymenoptera
- Family: Colletidae
- Genus: Leioproctus
- Species: L. bidentatus

Binomial name
- Leioproctus bidentatus Leijs 2018

= Leioproctus bidentatus =

Species of bee

Leioproctus bidentatus, or Leioproctus (Colletellus) bidentatus, is a species of bee in the family Colletidae and subfamily Colletinae. It is endemic to Australia. It was described by entomologist Remko Leijs in 2018.

== Etymology ==
The specific epithet bidentatus is an anatomical reference to the two teeth on the ventral margin of the clypeus.

== Description ==
The female holotype body length is 6.6 mm, head width 2.3 mm; male allotype body length 5.8 mm, head width 2.1 mm. Integumental colouration is mainly black and orange, with brown markings. The hair is white to grey.

== Distribution and habitat ==
The species occurs in south-west Western Australia. Type localities include Gooseberry Hill, and Cockleshell Gully near Jurien Bay.

== Behaviour ==
The adults are flying mellivores. Flowering plants visited by the bees include Thryptomene australis, Leptospermopsis erubescens, Stylidium bulbiferum and Verticordia acerosa, as well as Thysanotus, Agrostocrinum and Baeckea species.

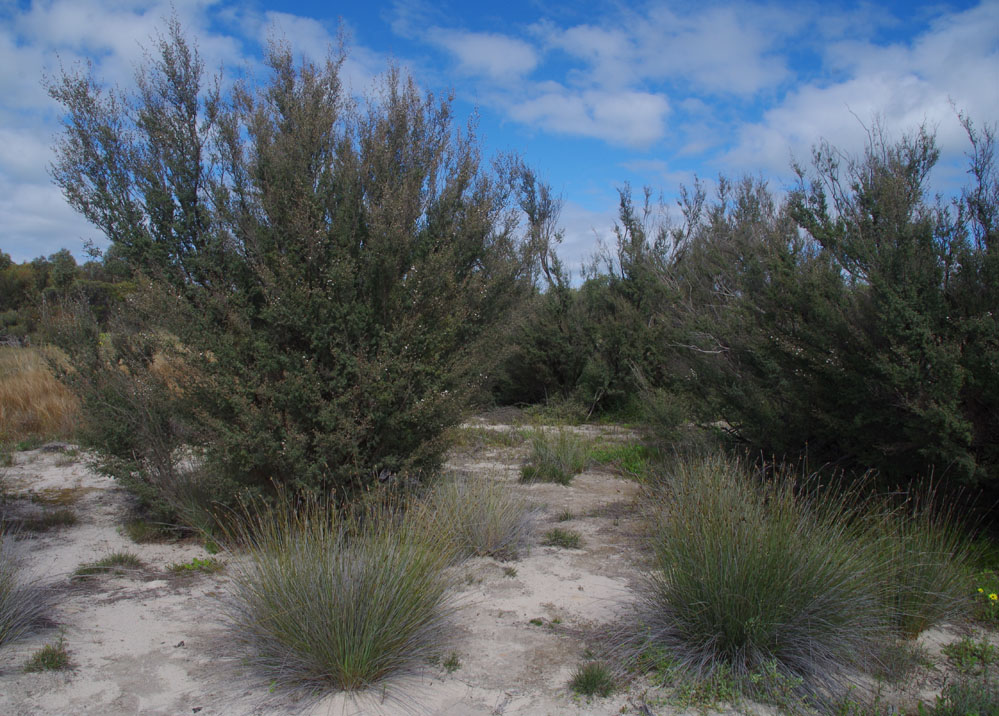
Leptospermopsis erubescens (roadside tea-tree), a forage plant of the bees
