= Thryptomene caduca =

Conservation status
- Priority Three — Poorly Known Taxa (DEC)

Scientific classification
- Kingdom: Plantae
- Clade: Tracheophytes
- Clade: Angiosperms
- Clade: Eudicots
- Clade: Rosids
- Order: Myrtales
- Family: Myrtaceae
- Genus: Thryptomene
- Species: T. caduca

Binomial name
- Thryptomene caduca Rye & Trudgen

Species of shrub

Thryptomene caduca is a species of flowering plant in the family Myrtaceae and is endemic to a small area in the north-west of Western Australia. It is a spreading shrub with crowded egg-shaped leaves with the narrower end towards the base, and pink flowers with five petals and seven to nine stamens.

== Description ==
Thryptomene caduca is a spreading shrub that typically grows to 0.7–1.5 m (2 ft 4 in – 4 ft 11 in) high and about 1 m (3 ft 3 in) wide. Its leaves are crowded on the branchlets, pointing upwards and egg-shaped to more or less round, 0.8–2.5 mm (0.031–0.098 in) long and 1.0–1.2 mm (0.039–0.047 in) wide on a petiole less than 0.2 mm (0.0079 in) long. The flowers are arranged raceme-like in groups of two to six on a peduncle 1–3 mm (0.039–0.118 in) long with egg-shaped bracteoles 1–1.2 mm (0.039–0.047 in) long that fall from the flower buds. The flowers are 5.5–7 mm (0.22–0.28 in) in diameter with egg-shaped to heart-shaped, pink sepals usually 0.5–0.8 mm (0.020–0.031 in) long and keeled. The petals are pink, 1.5–2.3 mm (0.059–0.091 in) long and there are seven to nine stamens. Flowering mainly occurs from July to September.

== Taxonomy ==
Thryptomene caduca was first formally described in 2014 by Barbara Lynette Rye and Malcolm Eric Trudgen in the journal Nuytsia from specimens collected by G.J. Keighery and N. Gibson in 1996. The specific epithet (caduca) means "dropping off early", referring to the bracteoles.

== Distribution and habitat ==
The shrub grows in sandy places including coastal sand dunes and is found from near Tamala Station to near Hamelin Pool and Kalbarri, often with Banksia or Eucalyptus species.

== Conservation status ==
Thryptomene caduca is classified as "Priority Two" by the Western Australian Government Department of Parks and Wildlife meaning that it is poorly known and from only one or a few locations.
