= Thryptomene podantha =

Scientific classification
- Kingdom: Plantae
- Clade: Tracheophytes
- Clade: Angiosperms
- Clade: Eudicots
- Clade: Rosids
- Order: Myrtales
- Family: Myrtaceae
- Genus: Thryptomene
- Species: T. podantha

Binomial name
- Thryptomene podantha Rye & Trudgen

Species of shrub

Thryptomene podantha is a species of flowering plant in the family Myrtaceae and is endemic to the west of Western Australia. It is a shrub with egg-shaped leaves with the narrower end towards the base, and flowers with pink sepals and petals and ten stamens.

== Description ==
Thryptomene podantha is an often widely-spreading shrub that typically grows to a height of 0.3–1.5 m (1 ft 0 in – 4 ft 11 in). Its leaves are upward-pointing, overlapping, and egg-shaped with the narrower end towards the base, 2.5–6.5 mm (0.098–0.256 in) long and 1.3–1.7 mm (0.051–0.067 in) wide on a petiole 0.4–0.7 mm (0.016–0.028 in) long. The flowers are arranged in racemes of more or less spherical groups of between two and seven flowers. Each flower is on a peduncle 0.5–1.5 mm (0.020–0.059 in) long with leaf-like bracteoles 1.0–1.3 mm (0.039–0.051 in) long that fall as the flower develops. The flowers are 4.5–5.5 mm (0.18–0.22 in) wide with pink, petal-like sepals 0.5–1.0 mm (0.020–0.039 in) long and 0.8–1.5 mm (0.031–0.059 in) wide. The petals are also pink, 2.0–2.4 mm (0.079–0.094 in) long and there are ten stamens. Flowering occurs from June to September.

== Taxonomy ==
Thryptomene podantha was first formally described in 2014 by Barbara Lynette Rye and Malcolm Eric Trudgen in the journal Nuytsia from specimens collected by Donald Bruce Foreman near Yuna in 1984. The specific epithet (podantha) means "foot-flowered", referring to the pedicellate flowers and fruit.

== Distribution and habitat ==
This thryptomene grows in open shrubland from near Shark Bay to Wandana Nature Reserve near Geraldton in the Carnarvon, Geraldton Sandplains and Yalgoo biogeographic regions of Western Australia.

== Conservation status ==
Thryptomene podantha is classified as "not threatened" by the Government of Western Australia Department of Parks and Wildlife.
