= Thryptomene eremaea =

Conservation status
- Priority Two — Poorly Known Taxa (DEC)

Scientific classification
- Kingdom: Plantae
- Clade: Tracheophytes
- Clade: Angiosperms
- Clade: Eudicots
- Clade: Rosids
- Order: Myrtales
- Family: Myrtaceae
- Genus: Thryptomene
- Species: T. eremaea

Binomial name
- Thryptomene eremaea Rye & Trudgen

Species of shrub

Thryptomene eremaea is a species of flowering plant in the family Myrtaceae and is endemic to Western Australia. It is an erect shrub with upward-pointing, oval leaves and white or pale pink flowers with five petals and ten irregularly arranged stamens.

== Description ==
Thryptomene eremaea is an erect shrub that typically grows a height of 0.5–1.5 m (1 ft 8 in – 4 ft 11 in). Its leaves are pointed upwards, dented on the upper surface, oval, 2.5–4 mm (0.098–0.157 in) long, 0.6–0.9 mm (0.024–0.035 in) wide on a petiole up to 0.6 mm (0.024 in) long and have a tip that curves outwards. The flowers are arranged in up to five pairs near the ends of the branchlets on peduncles 1–2 mm (0.039–0.079 in) long with pinkish elliptic to egg-shaped bracteoles about 2–2.5 mm (0.079–0.098 in) long that have an outward-curving point. The flowers are white or pale pink, about 7 mm (0.28 in) in diameter with egg-shaped sepals 1.5–2 mm (0.059–0.079 in) long, the petals broadly egg-shaped 2.7–3.5 mm (0.11–0.14 in) long, sometimes with minute teeth on the edges. There are usually ten, irregularly arranged stamens. Flowering occurs from July to December.

== Taxonomy ==
Thryptomene eremaea was first formally described in 2001 by Barbara Lynette Rye and Malcolm Eric Trudgen in the journal Nuytsia from specimens collected by D.J. Pearson near Queen Victoria Spring in 1992. The specific epithet (eremaea) refers to the species' distribution in the Eremaean botanical province.

== Distribution and habitat ==
This thryptomene grows in mallee shrubland on sandplains, sometimes over granite and is found between Menzies and Queen Victoria Spring in the Great Victoria Desert and Murchison biogeographic regions.

== Conservation status ==
Thryptomene eremaea is classified as "Priority Two" by the Western Australian Government Department of Parks and Wildlife meaning that it is poorly known and from only one or a few locations.
