= Thryptomene orbiculata =

Conservation status
- Priority Three — Poorly Known Taxa (DEC)

Scientific classification
- Kingdom: Plantae
- Clade: Tracheophytes
- Clade: Angiosperms
- Clade: Eudicots
- Clade: Rosids
- Order: Myrtales
- Family: Myrtaceae
- Genus: Thryptomene
- Species: T. orbiculata

Binomial name
- Thryptomene orbiculata Rye & Trudgen

Species of shrub

Thryptomene orbiculata is a species of flowering plant in the family Myrtaceae and is endemic to the west of Western Australia. It is a shrub with broadly egg-shaped to more or less round leaves, and flowers with five pinkish petals and usually ten stamens.

== Description ==
Thryptomene orbiculata is a shrub that typically grows to 0.5–1.5 m (1 ft 8 in – 4 ft 11 in) high and wide. Its leaves are broadly egg-shaped to more or less round, 2–3.5 mm (0.079–0.138 in) long and 2.3–3.3 mm (0.091–0.130 in) wide on a petiole 0.4–0.7 mm (0.016–0.028 in) long and more or less pressed against the stem. The flowers are arranged raceme-like in five to fifteen pairs along the branches on peduncles 1–2.5 mm (0.039–0.098 in) long with bracteoles 1.5–2.5 mm (0.059–0.098 in) long that remain until the fruit falls. The flowers are 5–8 mm (0.20–0.31 in) wide with petal-like sepals 2.0–2.5 mm (0.079–0.098 in) long. The petals are pink to pinkish-mauve, 2.2–2.4 mm (0.087–0.094 in) long and there are usually ten stamens. Flowering occurs from July to October.

== Taxonomy ==
Thryptomene orbiculata was first formally described in 2014 by Barbara Lynette Rye and Malcolm Eric Trudgen in the journal Nuytsia from specimens Trudgen collected north-east of Geraldton in 2003. The specific epithet (orbiculata) means "circular", referring to the shape of the leaves.

== Distribution and habitat ==
This thryptomene usually grows in sandy soil from near East Yuna to near Mingenew in the Avon Wheatbelt and Geraldton Sandplains biogeographic regions of Western Australia.

== Conservation status ==
Thryptomene orbiculata is classified as "Priority Three" by the Government of Western Australia Department of Parks and Wildlife meaning that it is poorly known and known from only a few locations but is not under imminent threat.
