= Thryptomene velutina =

Conservation status
- Priority Two — Poorly Known Taxa (DEC)

Scientific classification
- Kingdom: Plantae
- Clade: Tracheophytes
- Clade: Angiosperms
- Clade: Eudicots
- Clade: Rosids
- Order: Myrtales
- Family: Myrtaceae
- Genus: Thryptomene
- Species: T. velutina

Binomial name
- Thryptomene velutina Rye & Trudgen

Species of shrub

Thryptomene velutina is a shrub species in the family Myrtaceae that is endemic to Western Australia.

The shrub is found in the Mid West region of Western Australia between Geraldton and the Chapman Valley.

== Etymology ==
The specific epithet, velutina, is from the Latin adjective, velutinus, -a, -um, ("velvety"), and refers to the flower's velvety hypanthium, which distinguishes it from other Thryptomene species.
