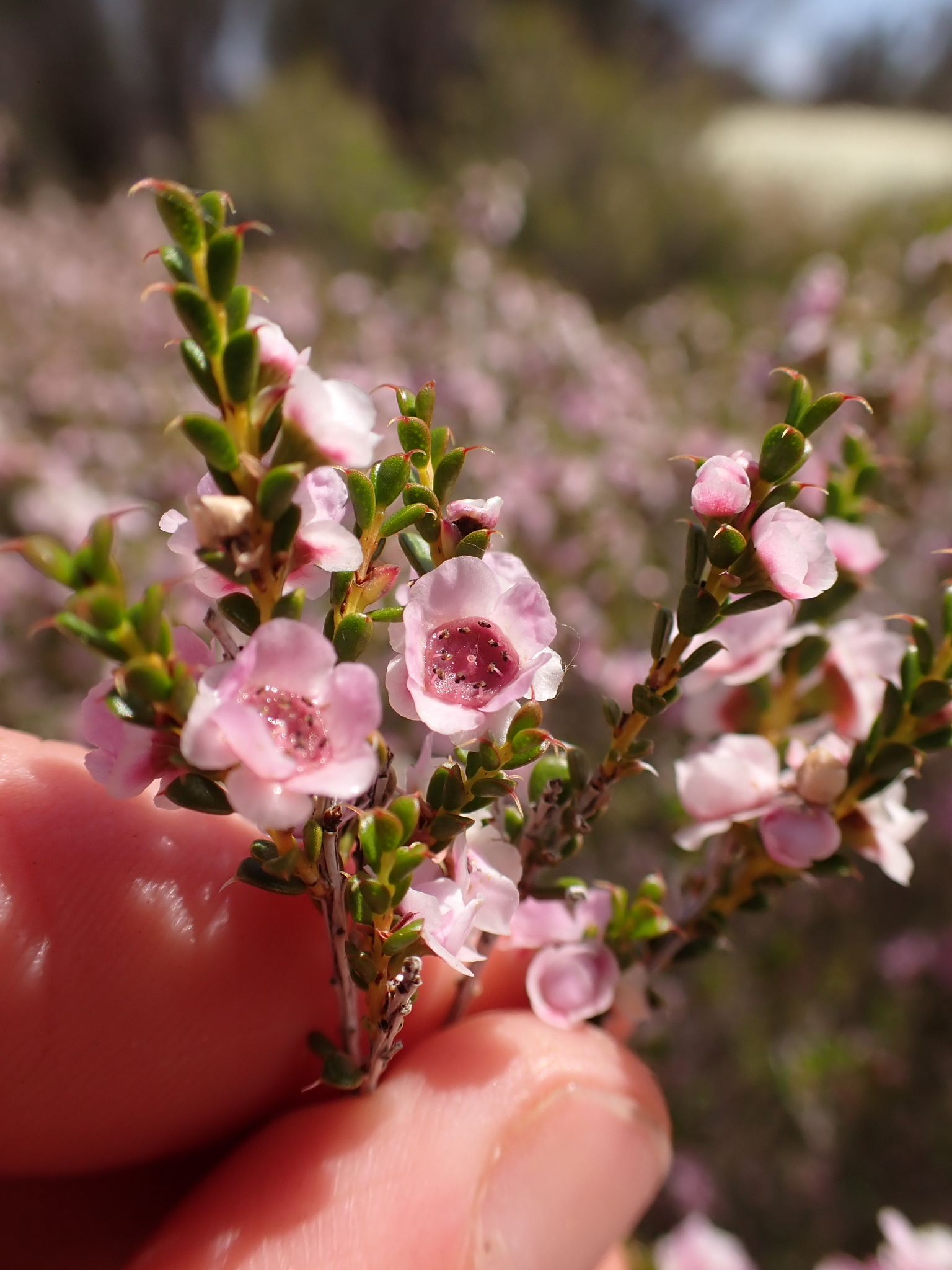

Scientific classification
- Kingdom: Plantae
- Clade: Tracheophytes
- Clade: Angiosperms
- Clade: Eudicots
- Clade: Rosids
- Order: Myrtales
- Family: Myrtaceae
- Genus: Thryptomene
- Species: T. costata

Binomial name
- Thryptomene costata Rye & Trudgen

= Thryptomene costata =

Species of shrub

Thryptomene costata is a species of flowering plant in the family Myrtaceae and is endemic to Western Australia. It is an erect shrub with upward pointing, egg-shaped leaves with the narrower end towards the base, and white or pink flowers with five petals and ten stamens.

== Description ==
Thryptomene costata is an erect shrub that typically grows to a height of 1–3 m (3 ft 3 in – 9 ft 10 in) and has many branches from just above ground level. Its leaves are pointed upwards and egg-shaped with the narrower end towards the base, 2–4.3 mm (0.079–0.169 in) long and 1.4–1.8 mm (0.055–0.071 in) wide on a petiole 0.4–0.7 mm (0.016–0.028 in) long. The flowers are arranged in pairs in up to four adjacent leaf axils, on peduncles 1–2 mm (0.039–0.079 in) long with egg-shaped bracteoles 1.3–3 mm (0.051–0.118 in) long that fall from the flower buds. The flowers are 7.5–9.5 mm (0.30–0.37 in) in diameter with egg-shaped, white or pale pink sepals 2.0–2.5 mm (0.079–0.098 in) long. The petals are white to deep pink, 2.5–3.3 mm (0.098–0.130 in) long and there are ten stamens opposite the sepals and petals. Flowering occurs from May to November.

== Taxonomy ==
Thryptomene costata was first formally described in 2001 by Barbara Lynette Rye and Malcolm Eric Trudgen in the journal Nuytsia from specimens collected by Trudgen in 1978. The specific epithet (costata) means "ribbed", referring to the floral cup.

== Distribution and habitat ==
This thryptomene grows on granite outcrops and other rocky places between Cue and Wubin and from Tallering Peak to near Menzies in the Avon Wheatbelt, Coolgardie, Murchison and Yalgoo biogeographic regions.

== Conservation status ==
Thryptomene costata is classified as "not threatened" by the Western Australian Government Department of Parks and Wildlife.
