= Thryptomene striata =

Conservation status
- Priority Two — Poorly Known Taxa (DEC)

Scientific classification
- Kingdom: Plantae
- Clade: Tracheophytes
- Clade: Angiosperms
- Clade: Eudicots
- Clade: Rosids
- Order: Myrtales
- Family: Myrtaceae
- Genus: Thryptomene
- Species: T. striata

Binomial name
- Thryptomene striata Rye & Trudgen

Species of shrub

Thryptomene striata is a shrub species in the family Myrtaceae that is endemic to Western Australia.

The erect and compact shrub typically grows to a height of 0.5 to 1 metre (2 to 3 ft). It blooms in September producing pink-purple flowers.

It is found in the Mid West region of Western Australia between Geraldton and Northampton where it grows in sandy to loamy soils with ironstone.
