= Thryptomene nitida =

Conservation status
- Priority Three — Poorly Known Taxa (DEC)

Scientific classification
- Kingdom: Plantae
- Clade: Tracheophytes
- Clade: Angiosperms
- Clade: Eudicots
- Clade: Rosids
- Order: Myrtales
- Family: Myrtaceae
- Genus: Thryptomene
- Species: T. nitida

Binomial name
- Thryptomene nitida Rye & Trudgen

Species of shrub

Thryptomene nitida is a species of flowering plant in the family Myrtaceae and is endemic to a small area in the south-west of Western Australia. It is a spreading shrub with upward-pointing, egg-shaped leaves with the narrower end towards the base, and flowers with five pale purple or pinkish petals and ten stamens.

== Description ==
Thryptomene nitida is a shrub that typically grows to a height of 30–80 cm (12–31 in) with widely spreading, more or less prostrate branches that produce adventitious roots. Its leaves are upward-pointing or pressed against the stem, egg-shaped with the narrower end towards the base, 1.8–2.4 mm (0.071–0.094 in) long and 0.8–1.4 mm (0.031–0.055 in) wide on a petiole up to 0.3 mm (0.012 in) long. The flowers are arranged in small clusters of usually two to four pairs of flowers on a peduncle 0.2–0.5 mm (0.0079–0.0197 in) long with leaf-like bracteoles 1.3–1.5 mm (0.051–0.059 in) long that remain until the fruit falls. The flowers are 4–5.5 mm (0.16–0.22 in) wide with triangular to egg-shaped sepals 0.5–0.7 mm (0.020–0.028 in) long and keeled. The petals are pale purple or pinkish, 1.5–2 mm (0.059–0.079 in) long and there are ten stamens. Flowering occurs from June to September.

== Taxonomy ==
Thryptomene nitida was first formally described in 2014 by Barbara Lynette Rye and Malcolm Eric Trudgen in the journal Nuytsia from specimens they collected near Three Springs in 2003. The specific epithet (nitida) means "shining", referring to the surface of the floral cup of the fruit.

== Distribution and habitat ==
This thryptomene grows near creeks and minor drainage lines from the Irwin River and Mingenew to Arrino in the Avon Wheatbelt and Geraldton Sandplains biogeographic regions of south-western Western Australia.

== Conservation status ==
Thryptomene nitida is classified as "Priority Three" by the Government of Western Australia Department of Parks and Wildlife meaning that it is poorly known and known from only a few locations but is not under imminent threat.
