= Thryptomene calcicola =

Conservation status
- Priority Two — Poorly Known Taxa (DEC)

Scientific classification
- Kingdom: Plantae
- Clade: Tracheophytes
- Clade: Angiosperms
- Clade: Eudicots
- Clade: Rosids
- Order: Myrtales
- Family: Myrtaceae
- Genus: Thryptomene
- Species: T. calcicola

Binomial name
- Thryptomene calcicola Rye

Species of plant

Thryptomene calcicola is a species of flowering plant in the family Myrtaceae and is endemic to a small area in the north-west of Western Australia. It is an erect, sometimes spreading shrub with upwards-pointing linear leaves, and pinkish-mauve flowers with five petals and ten stamens.

== Description ==
Thryptomene calcicola is an erect, sometimes spreading shrub that typically grows to a height of 0.3–1.8 m (1 ft 0 in – 5 ft 11 in). Its leaves are directed upwards, linear, 5–9 mm (0.20–0.35 in) long and 0.4–0.8 mm (0.016–0.031 in) wide on a petiole 0.1–0.4 mm (0.0039–0.0157 in) long. The flowers are arranged raceme-like in groups of four to fifteen on a peduncle 0.6–1 mm (0.024–0.039 in) long with egg-shaped bracteoles 2.2–3 mm (0.087–0.118 in) long and that remain until the fruit is shed. The flowers are 7–8 mm (0.28–0.31 in) in diameter with glossy, egg-shaped sepals 1.0–1.2 mm (0.039–0.047 in) long. The petals are pinkish-mauve, 2.5–3 mm (0.098–0.118 in) long and there are usually ten stamens. Flowering occurs from June to late October.

== Taxonomy ==
Thryptomene calcicola was first formally described in 2014 by Barbara Lynette Rye in the journal Nuytsia from specimens collected by Malcolm Eric Trudgen in Kalbarri National Park in 2002. The specific epithet (calcicola) means "lime-inhabitant", referring to the limestone habitat of this species.

== Distribution and habitat ==
This thryptomene only occurs in a small area of Kalbarri National Park where it grows in Acacia shrubland.

== Conservation status ==
Thryptomene calcicola is classified as "Priority Two" by the Western Australian Government Department of Parks and Wildlife, meaning that it is poorly known and from only one or a few locations.
