= Thryptomene pinifolia =

Conservation status
- Priority Two — Poorly Known Taxa (DEC)

Scientific classification
- Kingdom: Plantae
- Clade: Tracheophytes
- Clade: Angiosperms
- Clade: Eudicots
- Clade: Rosids
- Order: Myrtales
- Family: Myrtaceae
- Genus: Thryptomene
- Species: T. pinifolia

Binomial name
- Thryptomene pinifolia Rye & Trudgen

Species of shrub

Thryptomene pinifolia is a species of flowering plant in the family Myrtaceae and is endemic to Kalbarri National Park in Western Australia. It is a shrub with linear leaves, and flowers with pale pinkish sepals and petals and seven or eight stamens.

== Description ==
Thryptomene pinifolia is a shrub that typically grows to a height of up to 50 mm (2.0 in). Its leaves are linear, about 8.5 mm (0.33 in) long, 0.4 mm (0.016 in) wide and 0.3–0.5 mm (0.012–0.020 in) thick, on a petiole about 1 mm (0.039 in) long. They are prominently glandular and curve upwards. The flowers are arranged in clusters of two or three pairs near the ends of branchlets on peduncles 0.8–1.3 mm (0.031–0.051 in) long. The flowers are about 4.5 mm (0.18 in) wide with broadly egg-shaped, pale pink, petal-like sepals about 1.4 mm (0.055 in) long and wide. The petals are pale pink, about 1.6 mm (0.063 in) long and there are seven or eight stamens. Flowering occurs from October to November.

== Taxonomy ==
Thryptomene pinifolia was first formally described in 2014 by Barbara Lynette Rye and Malcolm Eric Trudgen in the journal Nuytsia from specimens collected near Eurardy in 2000. The specific epithet (pinifolia) means "pine-leaved".

== Distribution and habitat ==
This thryptomene grows in sand on sandplain in Kalbarri National Park in the Geraldton Sandplains biogeographic region of Western Australia.

== Conservation status ==
Thryptomene pinifolia is classified as "Priority Two" by the Western Australian Government Department of Parks and Wildlife meaning that it is poorly known and from only one or a few locations.
