= Thryptomene hubbardii =

Conservation status
- Priority Three — Poorly Known Taxa (DEC)

Scientific classification
- Kingdom: Plantae
- Clade: Tracheophytes
- Clade: Angiosperms
- Clade: Eudicots
- Clade: Rosids
- Order: Myrtales
- Family: Myrtaceae
- Genus: Thryptomene
- Species: T. hubbardii

Binomial name
- Thryptomene hubbardii Rye & Trudgen

Species of shrub

Thryptomene hubbardii is a species of flowering plant in the family Myrtaceae and is endemic to a small area in the west of Western Australia. It is a spreading shrub with crowded broadly egg-shaped leaves with the narrower end towards the base, and flowers with five pale pink petals and nine or ten stamens.

== Description ==
Thryptomene hubbardii is a spreading shrub that typically grows to 0.5–1.0 m (1 ft 8 in – 3 ft 3 in) high and 0.7–2.2 m (2 ft 4 in – 7 ft 3 in) wide. Its leaves are crowded on the branchlets, pointing upwards or pressed against the stem, broadly egg-shaped with the narrower end towards the base, 2.5–4.3 mm (0.098–0.169 in) long and 2.8–3.4 mm (0.11–0.13 in) wide on a petiole 0.4–1 mm (0.016–0.039 in) long. The flowers are arranged in small clusters of two to four pairs of flowers on a peduncle 0.6–2.5 mm (0.024–0.098 in) long with bracteoles 1.5–2.5 mm (0.059–0.098 in) long that remain until the fruit falls. The flowers are 6–8 mm (0.24–0.31 in) in diameter with broadly heart-shaped sepals 1.5–2.5 mm (0.059–0.098 in) long and keeled. The petals are usually pale pink, 2.5–3.3 mm (0.098–0.130 in) long and there are nine or ten stamens. Flowering occurs from August to December.

== Taxonomy ==
Thryptomene hubbardii was first formally described in 2014 by Barbara Lynette Rye and Malcolm Eric Trudgen in the journal Nuytsia from specimens collected by near Mullewa by Bronwen and Gregory Keighery in 2004. The specific epithet (hubbardii) honours Richard T. Hubbard, who prepared a detailed but unpublished manuscript for the Myrtaceae of Western Australia.

== Distribution and habitat ==
This thryptomene grows in tall shrubland and mallee woodland from the East Yuna Nature Reserve to Indarra Springs Nature Reserve in the Avon Wheatbelt and Geraldton Sandplains biogeographic regions of Western Australia.

== Conservation status ==
Thryptomene hubbardii is classified as "Priority Two" by the Western Australian Government Department of Parks and Wildlife meaning that it is poorly known and from only one or a few locations.
