= Thryptomene stapfii =

Conservation status
- Priority Three — Poorly Known Taxa (DEC)

Scientific classification
- Kingdom: Plantae
- Clade: Tracheophytes
- Clade: Angiosperms
- Clade: Eudicots
- Clade: Rosids
- Order: Myrtales
- Family: Myrtaceae
- Genus: Thryptomene
- Species: T. stapfii

Binomial name
- Thryptomene stapfii Rye & Trudgen

Species of shrub

Thryptomene stapfii is a shrub species in the family Myrtaceae that is endemic to Western Australia.

The shrub is found in a small area the Mid West region of Western Australia between Geraldton and Northampton.
