= Thryptomene wannooensis =

Conservation status
- Priority One — Poorly Known Taxa (DEC)

Scientific classification
- Kingdom: Plantae
- Clade: Tracheophytes
- Clade: Angiosperms
- Clade: Eudicots
- Clade: Rosids
- Order: Myrtales
- Family: Myrtaceae
- Genus: Thryptomene
- Species: T. wannooensis

Binomial name
- Thryptomene wannooensis Rye

Species of shrub

Thryptomene wannooensis is a shrub species in the family Myrtaceae that is endemic to Western Australia.

The shrub is found in the Gascoyne region of Western Australia near Shark Bay.
