= Thryptomene dampieri =

Scientific classification
- Kingdom: Plantae
- Clade: Tracheophytes
- Clade: Angiosperms
- Clade: Eudicots
- Clade: Rosids
- Order: Myrtales
- Family: Myrtaceae
- Genus: Thryptomene
- Species: T. dampieri

Binomial name
- Thryptomene dampieri Rye

Species of shrub

Thryptomene dampieri is a species of flowering plant in the family Myrtaceae and is endemic to the north-west of Western Australia. It is a low, spreading shrub with prostrate stems, broadly egg-shaped leaves with the narrower end towards the base, and pinkish flowers with five petals and ten stamens.

== Description ==
Thryptomene dampieri is usually a low, spreading shrub that typically grows to a height of 0.2–0.7 m (7.9 in – 2 ft 3.6 in) with sprawling or prostrate stems that often form adventitious roots. Its leaves are more or less pressed against the stem, egg-shaped with the lower end towards the base, 1.3–3 mm (0.051–0.118 in) long and 1.5–2.2 mm (0.059–0.087 in) wide on a petiole 0.2–0.5 mm (0.0079–0.0197 in) long. The flowers are arranged in pairs in groups of up to eight along flowering branchlets on a peduncle 0.2–0.8 mm (0.0079–0.0315 in) long with egg-shaped bracteoles 0.6–1.6 mm (0.024–0.063 in) long that remain until the fruit is shed. The flowers are 4–6 mm (0.16–0.24 in) in diameter with pale pink, egg-shaped sepals 0.5–0.9 mm (0.020–0.035 in) long. The petals are pink or pinkish-purple, 1.5–2 mm (0.059–0.079 in) long and there are usually ten stamens. Flowering occurs from April to September.

== Taxonomy ==
Thryptomene dampieri was first formally described in 2014 by Barbara Lynette Rye in the journal Nuytsia from specimens collected by John Green near Denham in 1957. The specific epithet (dampieri) honours William Dampier who collected this species near Shark Bay in 1699.

== Distribution and habitat ==
This thryptomene grows in sand on dunes and limestone from near Exmouth to Hamelin Bay and on several off-shore islands.

== Conservation status ==
Thryptomene dampieri is classified as "not threatened" by the Western Australian Government Department of Parks and Wildlife. The species occurs in a long stretch of the coast of Western Australia north of Shark Bay.
