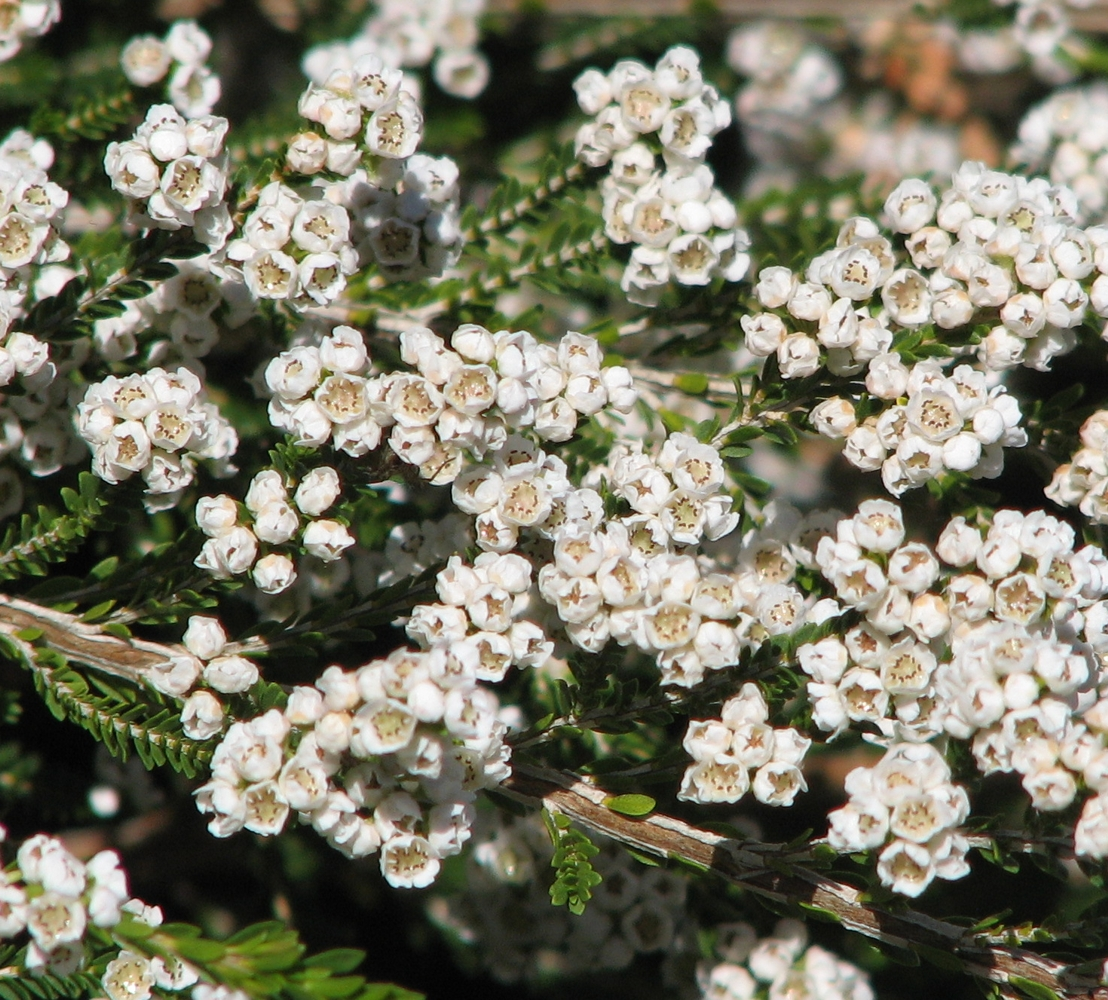
- Thryptomene saxicola (white flower form)

Scientific classification
- Kingdom: Plantae
- Clade: Tracheophytes
- Clade: Angiosperms
- Clade: Eudicots
- Clade: Rosids
- Order: Myrtales
- Family: Myrtaceae
- Subfamily: Myrtoideae
- Tribe: Chamelaucieae
- Genus: Thryptomene; Endl.

Synonyms
- Astraea Schauer nom. illeg., nom. superfl.; Bucheria Heynh. nom. illeg., nom. superfl.; Gomphotis Raf. nom. rej.; Paryphantha Schauer; Thryptomene sect. Astraea Stapf; Thryptomene sect. Euthryptomene Kuntze nom. inval.; Thryptomene sect. Paryphantha (Schauer) Kuntze; Thryptomene sect. Paryphantha (Schauer) Stapf isonym

= Thryptomene =

Genus of flowering plants

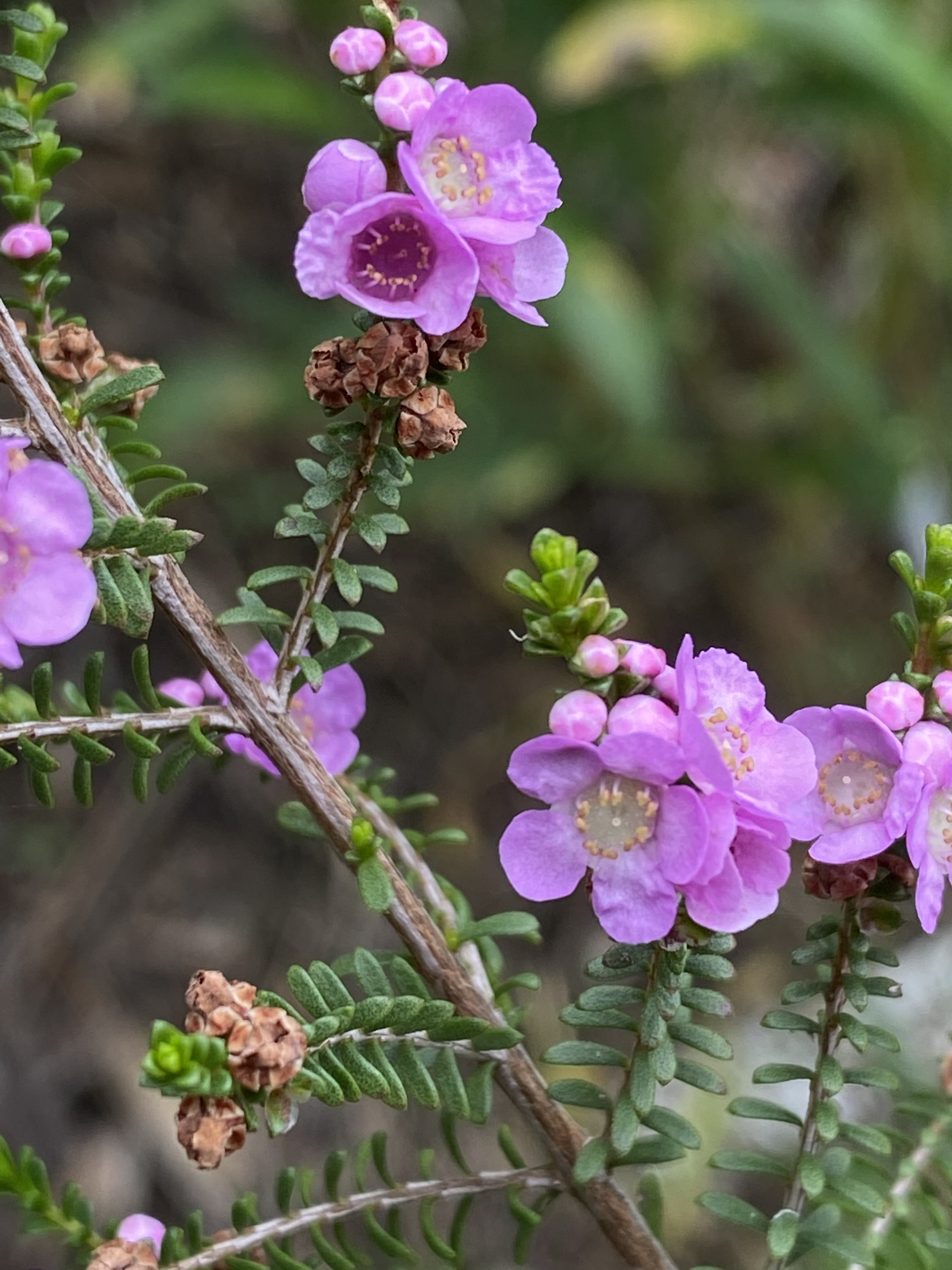
Thryptomene denticulata

Thryptomene is a genus of flowering plants in the family Myrtaceae and is endemic to Australia. Plants in the genus Thryptomene are shrubs with small leaves arranged in opposite pairs and white or pink flowers. About forty-seven species of Thryptomene, occurring in all Australian states and the Northern Territory, have been formally described.

== Description ==
Plants in the genus Thryptomene are erect, slender shrubs typically growing to a height of 0.5–2.5 m (1 ft 8 in – 8 ft 2 in) with small leaves arranged in opposite pairs with oil glands especially visible on the lower surface. The flowers are usually arranged singly or in pairs in leaf axils, and usually have five sepals, five white or pink petals and five, rarely ten or fifteen stamens. The fruit is a nut usually containing a single seed.

== Taxonomy ==
The genus Thryptomene was first formally described in 1838 by Stephan Ladislaus Endlicher in Stirpium Australasicarum Herbarii Hugeliani Decades Tres, published in the journal Annalen des Wiener Museums der Naturgeschichte and the first species described was Thryptomene australis. The name Thryptomene means "made small".

=== Species list ===
The following is a list of Thrypomene species accepted by the Australian Plant Census as of April 2021:

- Thryptomene australis Endl. – hook-leaf thryptomene (W.A.)
- Thryptomene baeckeacea F.Muell. (W.A.)
- Thryptomene biseriata J.W.Green (W.A., S.A.)
- Thryptomene caduca Rye & Trudgen (W.A.)
- Thryptomene calcicola Rye (W.A.)
- Thryptomene calycina (Lindl.) Stapf - Grampians thryptomene (Vic.)
- Thryptomene costata Rye & Trudgen (W.A.)
- Thryptomene cuspidata (Turcz.) J.W.Green (W.A.)
- Thryptomene dampieri Rye (W.A.)
- Thryptomene decussata (W.Fitzg.) J.W.Green (W.A.)
- Thryptomene denticulata (F.Muell.) Benth. (W.A.)
- Thryptomene duplicata Rye & Trudgen (W.A.)
- Thryptomene elliottii F.Muell. (W.A., S.A.)
- Thryptomene eremaea Rye & Trudgen (W.A.)
- Thryptomene ericaea F.Muell. (S.A.)
- Thryptomene globifera Rye (W.A.)
- Thryptomene hexandra C.T.White (N.T., Qld., N.S.W.)
- Thryptomene hubbardii Rye & Trudgen (W.A.)
- Thryptomene hyporhytis Turcz. (W.A.)
- Thryptomene johnsonii F.Muell. (W.A.)
- Thryptomene kochii E.Pritz. (W.A.)
- Thryptomene longifolia J.W.Green (S.A.)
- Thryptomene micrantha Hook.f. (S.A., Vic., Tas.)
- Thryptomene mucronulata Turcz. (W.A.)
- Thryptomene naviculata J.W.Green (W.A.)
- Thryptomene nealensis J.W.Green (W.A.)
- Thryptomene nitida Rye & Trudgen (W.A.)
- Thryptomene oligandra F.Muell. (Qld.)
- Thryptomene orbiculata Rye & Trudgen (W.A.)
- Thryptomene parviflora (F.Muell. ex Benth.) Domin (Qld.)
- Thryptomene pinifolia Rye & Trudgen (W.A.)
- Thryptomene podantha Rye & Trudgen (W.A.)
- Thryptomene racemulosa Turcz. (W.A.)
- Thryptomene remota A.R.Bean (W.A.)
- Thryptomene repens Rye & Trudgen (W.A.)
- Thryptomene salina Rye & Trudgen (W.A.)
- Thryptomene saxicola (A.Cunn. ex Hook.) Schauer – rock thryptomene (W.A.)
- Thryptomene shirleyae Rye (W.A.)
- Thryptomene spicata Rye & Trudgen (W.A.)
- Thryptomene stapfii Rye & Trudgen (W.A.)
- Thryptomene stenophylla E.Pritz. (W.A.)
- Thryptomene striata Rye & Trudgen (W.A.)
- Thryptomene strongylophylla F.Muell. ex Benth. (W.A.)
- Thryptomene urceolaris F.Muell. (W.A., S.A.)
- Thryptomene velutina Rye & Trudgen (W.A.)
- Thryptomene wannooensis Rye (W.A.)
- Thryptomene wittweri J.W.Green (W.A.)

== Use in horticulture ==
Thryptomene saxicola has been cultivated for many years as a hardy garden plant and along with T. calycina is popular in the cut-flower trade.
