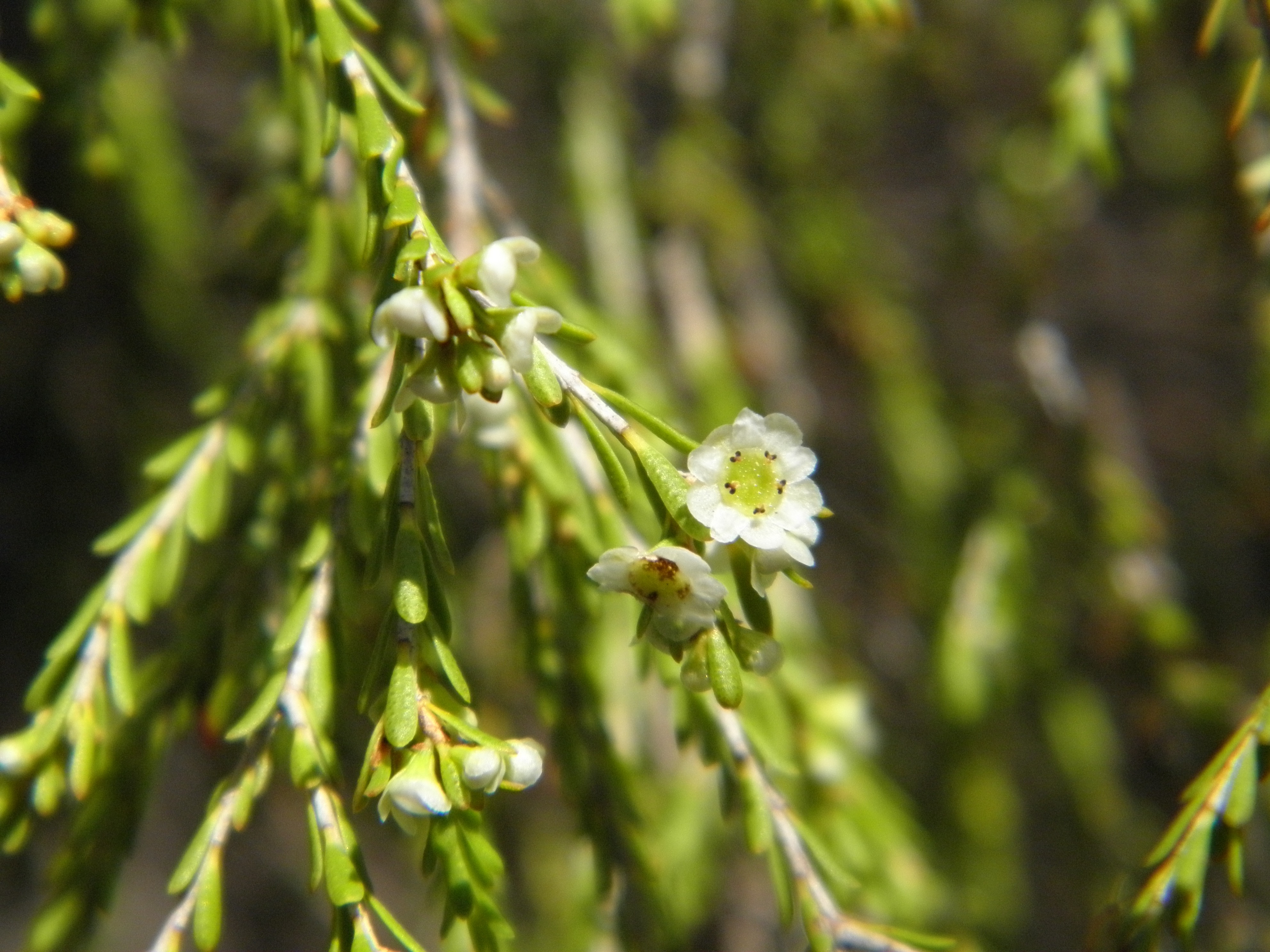
- In the White Mountains National Park

Scientific classification
- Kingdom: Plantae
- Clade: Tracheophytes
- Clade: Angiosperms
- Clade: Eudicots
- Clade: Rosids
- Order: Myrtales
- Family: Myrtaceae
- Genus: Thryptomene
- Species: T. parviflora

Binomial name
- Thryptomene parviflora (F.Muell. ex Benth.) Domin

Synonyms
- Thryptomene oligandra var. parviflora F.Muell. ex Benth.

= Thryptomene parviflora =

Species of flowering plant

Thryptomene parviflora is a species of flowering plant in the family Myrtaceae and is endemic to Queensland. It is a slender, erect shrub with decussate, linear to egg-shaped leaves with the narrower end towards the base, and flowers with five petals and five stamens arranged singly in leaf axils.

== Description ==
Thryptomene parviflora is a shrub that typically grows to a height of 0.3–2.1 m (1 ft 0 in – 6 ft 11 in). Its leaves are decussate, more or less overlapping, linear to egg-shaped with the narrower end towards the base, 1.5–7 mm (0.059–0.276 in) long and about 1 mm (0.039 in) wide. The flowers are arranged singly in leaf axils, forming a raceme near the ends of branchlets on a peduncle about 0.4 mm (0.016 in) long. The sepals and petals are similar to each other, about 0.7 mm (0.028 in) long and 1.3 mm (0.051 in) wide. There are usually five stamens and the style is about 0.8 mm (0.031 in) long and about level with the anthers that curve towards it.

== Taxonomy ==
This thryptomene was first formally described in 1867 by George Bentham who gave it the name Thryptomene oligandra var. parviflora in Flora Australiensis from an unpublished description by Ferdinand von Mueller. The type specimens were collected by Mueller from near the Gilbert River. In 1928, Karel Domin raised the variety to species status as Thryptomene parviflora. The specific epithet (parviflora) means "small-flowered".

== Distribution and habitat ==
This thryptomene grows in a variety of soils in woodland and forest in arid areas of inland south-eastern Queensland.

== Conservation status ==
Thryptomene oligandra is classified as of "least concern" under the Queensland Government Nature Conservation Act 1992.
