= Thryptomene remota =

Scientific classification
- Kingdom: Plantae
- Clade: Tracheophytes
- Clade: Angiosperms
- Clade: Eudicots
- Clade: Rosids
- Order: Myrtales
- Family: Myrtaceae
- Genus: Thryptomene
- Species: T. remota

Binomial name
- Thryptomene remota A.R.Bean

Species of shrub

Thryptomene remota is a species of flowering plant in the family Myrtaceae and is endemic to the northern part of the Northern Territory. It is an erect shrub with linear to lance-shaped leaves with the narrower end towards the base, and white or cream-coloured flowers with ten stamens.

== Description ==
Thryptomene remota is an erect shrub that typically grows to a height of 0.3–3 m (1 ft 0 in – 9 ft 10 in) and has rough, fibrous bark. Its leaves are arranged in opposite pairs, linear to lance-shaped with the narrower end towards the base, prominently glandular, 3.3–6 mm (0.13–0.24 in) long and 0.7–1.0 mm (0.028–0.039 in) wide on a petiole 0.5–0.8 mm (0.020–0.031 in) long. The flowers are arranged singly in leaf axils on peduncles 0.9–1.3 mm (0.035–0.051 in) long with two boat-shaped bracteoles 1.5–1.8 mm (0.059–0.071 in) long and 1.3–1.5 mm (0.051–0.059 in) wide. The sepals lobes are about 1 mm (0.039 in) long and 1.5 mm (0.059 in) wide and the petals more or less round, white or cream-coloured, 1.5–1.8 mm (0.059–0.071 in) wide. There are ten stamens and flowering has been observed between November and July.

== Taxonomy ==
Thryptomene remota was first formally described in 1997 by Anthony Bean in the journal Austrobaileya from specimens by Clyde Dunlop collected near Jim Jim Falls in 1981. The specific epithet (remota) means "remote" referring to the species' distance from its relatives in the south-west of Western Australia.

== Distribution and habitat ==
This thryptomene grows in shrubland and woodland, mainly in Kakadu National Park and parts of nearby Arnhem Land.

== Conservation status ==
Thryptomene remota is classified as of "least concern" under the Northern Territory Government Territory Parks and Wildlife Conservation Act 1976.
