= Acacia trudgeniana =

Scientific classification
- Kingdom: Plantae
- Clade: Tracheophytes
- Clade: Angiosperms
- Clade: Eudicots
- Clade: Rosids
- Order: Fabales
- Family: Fabaceae
- Subfamily: Caesalpinioideae
- Clade: Mimosoid clade
- Genus: Acacia
- Species: A. trudgeniana

Binomial name
- Acacia trudgeniana Maslin
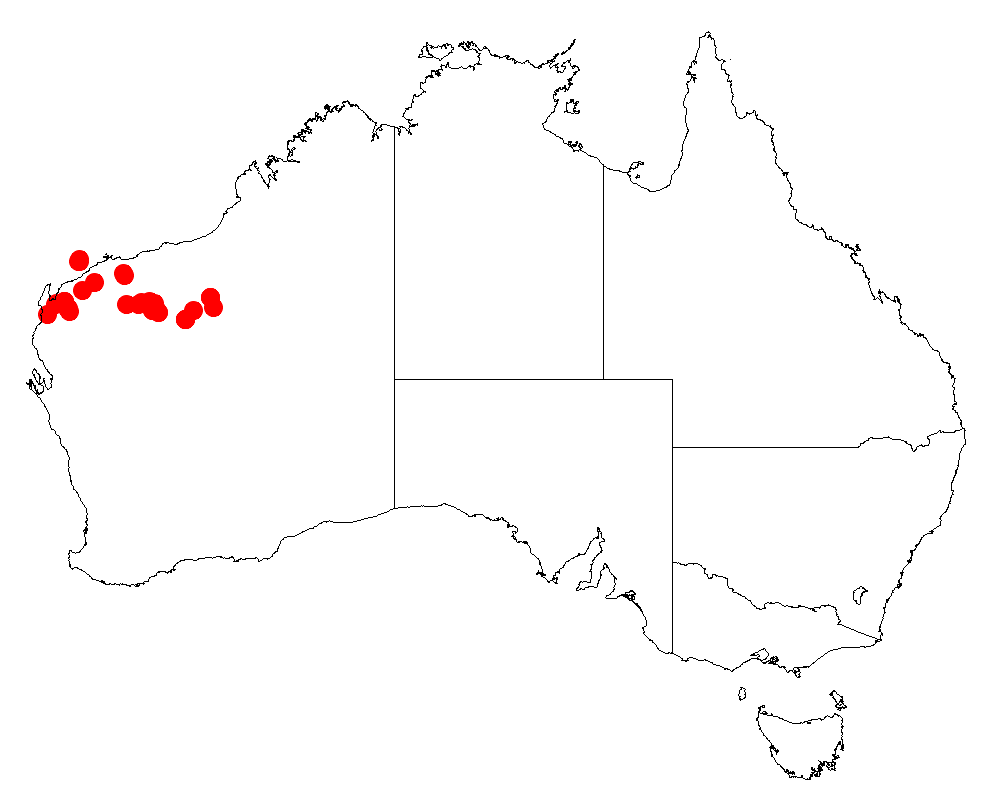
- Occurrence data from AVH

Species of legume

Acacia trudgeniana (common name - Trudgen's wattle) is a shrub of the genus Acacia and the subgenus Phyllodineae. It is native to a small area in the Gascoyne and Pilbara regions of Western Australia.

== Taxonomy ==
It was first described by Bruce Maslin in 2008, and was named for Malcolm Trudgen, who first drew Maslin's attention to its existence.

== See also ==
- List of Acacia species
