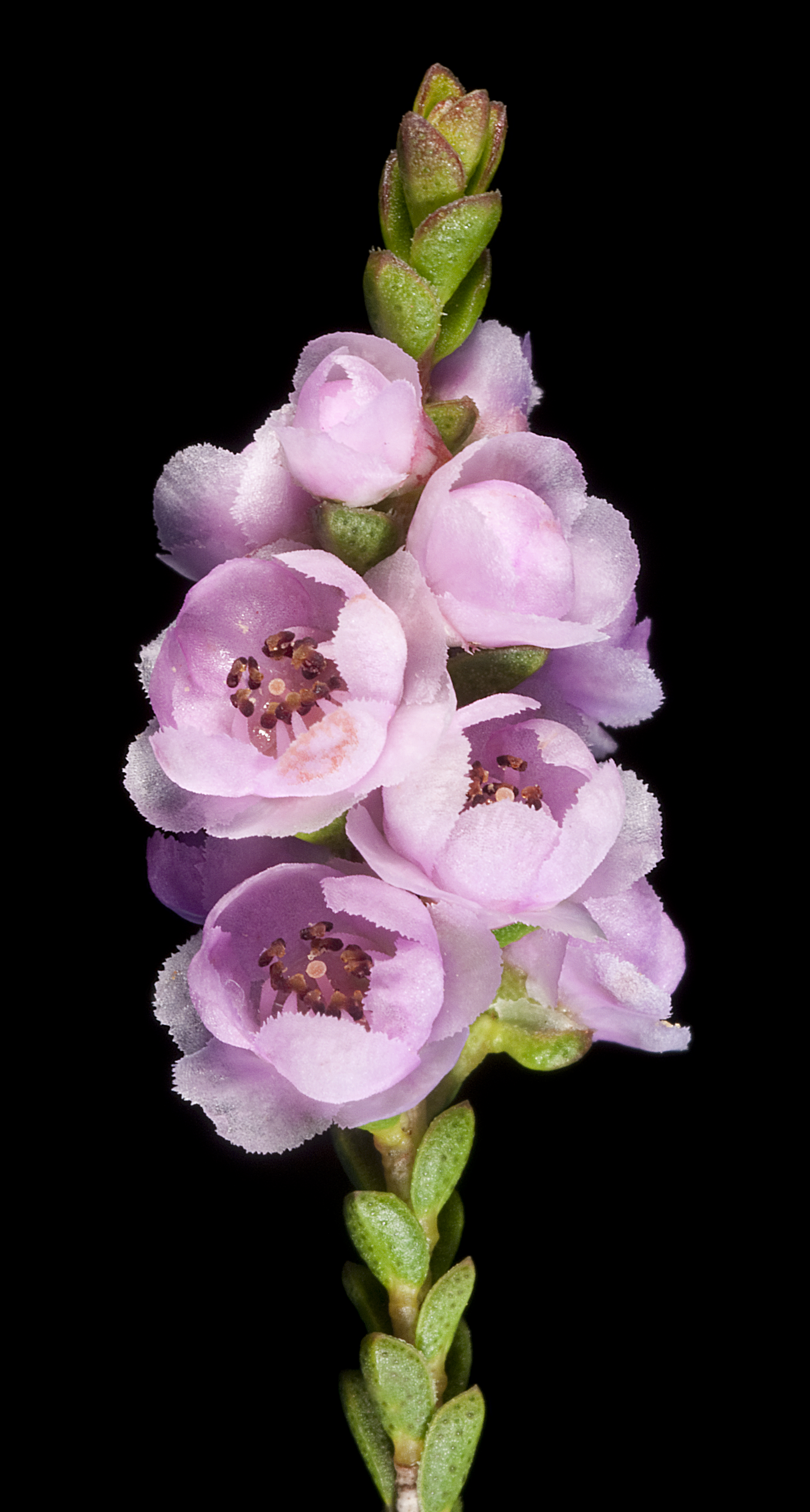

Scientific classification
- Kingdom: Plantae
- Clade: Tracheophytes
- Clade: Angiosperms
- Clade: Eudicots
- Clade: Rosids
- Order: Myrtales
- Family: Myrtaceae
- Genus: Thryptomene
- Species: T. racemulosa

Binomial name
- Thryptomene racemulosa Turcz.

= Thryptomene racemulosa =

Species of shrub

Thryptomene racemulosa is a species of flowering plant in the family Myrtaceae and is endemic to Western Australia. It is a shrub that typically grows to a height of 0.3 to 1.5 metres (1 to 5 ft) and blooms between July and October producing pink-white flowers. It is found on sand plains and low ridges in the Mid West and Wheatbelt regions of Western Australia where it grows in gravelly sandy soils. It was first formally described in 1847 by Nikolai Turczaninow in the Bulletin de la Société Impériale des Naturalistes de Moscou from specimens collected by James Drummond. The specific epithet (racemulosa) means "small raceme".
