= Thryptomene shirleyae =

Conservation status
- Priority Two — Poorly Known Taxa (DEC)

Scientific classification
- Kingdom: Plantae
- Clade: Tracheophytes
- Clade: Angiosperms
- Clade: Eudicots
- Clade: Rosids
- Order: Myrtales
- Family: Myrtaceae
- Genus: Thryptomene
- Species: T. shirleyae

Binomial name
- Thryptomene shirleyae Rye

Species of shrub

Thryptomene shirleyae is a shrub species in the family Myrtaceae that is endemic to Western Australia.

The shrub is found in a small area the Wheatbelt region of Western Australia between Carnamah and Dalwallinu.
