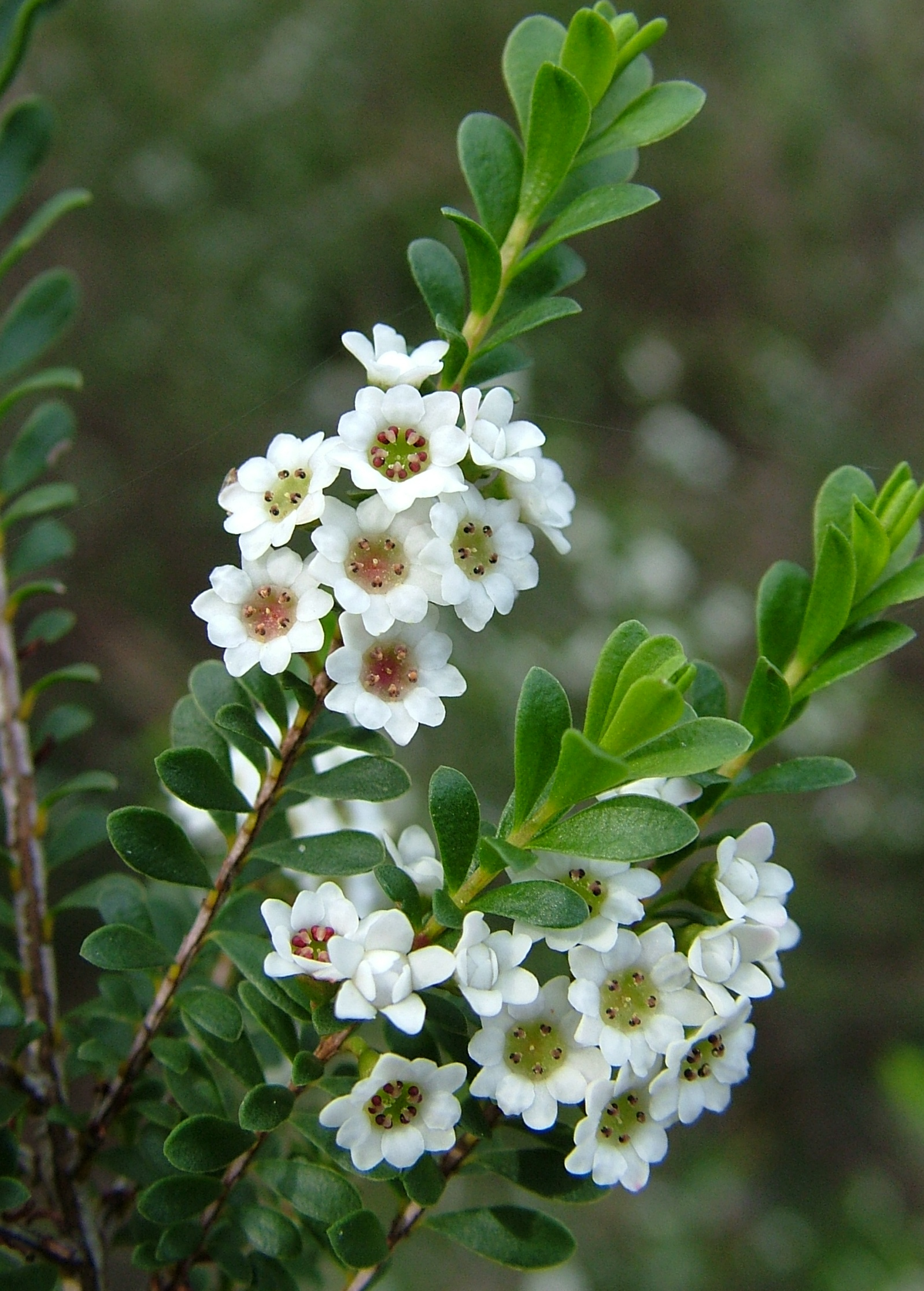
- Thryptomene calycina, the Grampians, Victoria

Scientific classification
- Kingdom: Plantae
- Clade: Tracheophytes
- Clade: Angiosperms
- Clade: Eudicots
- Clade: Rosids
- Order: Myrtales
- Family: Myrtaceae
- Genus: Thryptomene
- Species: T. calycina

Binomial name
- Thryptomene calycina (Lindl.) Stapf

Synonyms
- Baeckea calycina Lindl.; Paryphantha mitchelliana Schauer nom. illeg.; Baeckea calycina (Lindl.) J.M.Black; Thryptomene mitchelliana (Schauer) F.Muell.; Thryptomene thymifolia Stapf; Tryptomene mitchelliana F.Muell. orth. var.

= Thryptomene calycina =

Grampians thryptomene

Species of shrub

Thryptomene calycina, commonly known as Grampians thryptomene, is a species of flowering plant in the family Myrtaceae and is endemic to Victoria in Australia. It is an erect or spreading shrub with oblong, elliptic or egg-shaped leaves with the narrower end toward the base, and white flowers with five stamens.

== Description ==
Thryptomene calycina is an erect or spreading shrub that typically grows to a height of 1–3 m (3 ft 3 in – 9 ft 10 in). Its leaves are oblong to elliptic or egg-shaped with the narrower end toward the base, 5–14 mm (0.20–0.55 in) long, 2–4 mm (0.079–0.157 in) wide and sessile with a keel on the lower surface. The flowers are borne singly, in pairs or groups of three in upper leaf axils on a pedicel 2–6 mm (0.079–0.236 in) long. The flowers are often pinkish in bud, the sepals and petals similar to each other, white, broadly elliptic, about 1.5 mm (0.059 in) long and there are five stamens. Flowering mostly occurs from July to November.

== Taxonomy ==
This species was first formally described in 1838 by John Lindley who gave it the name Baeckea calycina in Thomas Mitchell's book, Three Expeditions into the interior of Eastern Australia . In 1924, Otto Stapf changed the name to Thryptomene calycina in The Botanical Magazine.

== Distribution and habitat ==
Grampians thryptomene mostly grows in sandy soil and is found in heath and heathy woodland in the Grampians, although it is naturalised in a suburb of Melbourne and there is an old record from South Australia.

== Conservation status ==
This thryptomene is listed as "rare in Victoria" on the Department of Sustainability and Environment's Advisory List of Rare Or Threatened Plants In Victoria.

== Use in horticulture ==
Thryptomene calycina is propagated from cuttings and is sometimes available in commercial nurseries. It requires light soil and full sun or part shade.
