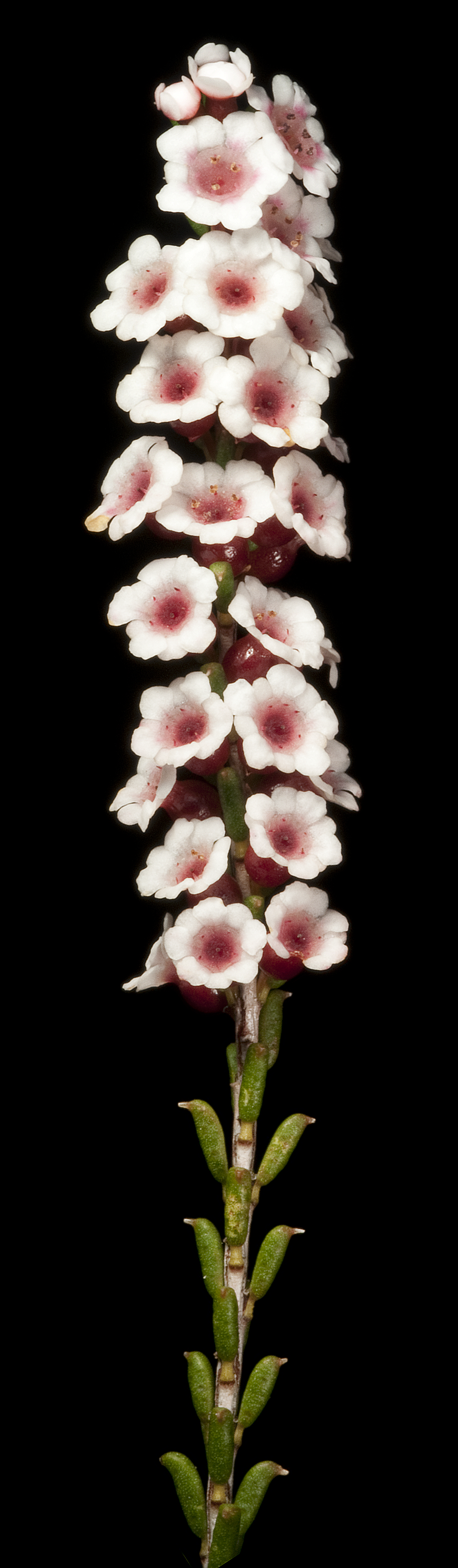

Scientific classification
- Kingdom: Plantae
- Clade: Tracheophytes
- Clade: Angiosperms
- Clade: Eudicots
- Clade: Rosids
- Order: Myrtales
- Family: Myrtaceae
- Genus: Thryptomene
- Species: T. kochii

Binomial name
- Thryptomene kochii E.Pritz.

= Thryptomene kochii =

Species of shrub

Thryptomene kochii is a shrub species in the family Myrtaceae that is endemic to Western Australia. It typically grows to a height of 0.6 to 3 metres (2 to 10 ft). It blooms between May and October producing pink-white flowers. This thryptomene is found on plains in the Wheatbelt and Goldfields-Esperance regions of Western Australia where it grows in sandy to loamy soils.

This species was first formally described in 1911 by Ernst Georg Pritzel in the journal Repertorium specierum novarum regni vegetabilis from specimens collected by Max Koch near Cowcowing in 1904. The specific epithet (kochii) honours the collector of the type specimens.
