= Thryptomene elliottii =

Scientific classification
- Kingdom: Plantae
- Clade: Tracheophytes
- Clade: Angiosperms
- Clade: Eudicots
- Clade: Rosids
- Order: Myrtales
- Family: Myrtaceae
- Genus: Thryptomene
- Species: T. elliottii

Binomial name
- Thryptomene elliottii F.Muell.

Synonyms
- Thryptomene whiteae J.M.Black

Species of shrub

Thryptomene elliottii is a species of flowering plant in the family Myrtaceae and is endemic to southern central Australia. It is a shrub with decussate, egg-shaped to club-shaped leaves and pink or white flowers with five petals and five stamens.

== Description ==
Thryptomene elliottii is a shrub that typically grows to a height of 0.3–1.5 m (1 ft 0 in – 4 ft 11 in). Its leaves are arranged in opposite pairs, decussate, club-shaped to egg-shaped with the narrower end towards the base, 2–3 mm (0.079–0.118 in) long and about 1 mm (0.039 in) wide on a short petiole. The flowers are usually arranged singly in leaf axils, crowded amongst the leaves along 4–5 mm (0.16–0.20 in) of the branches, each flower on a peduncle about 1 mm (0.039 in) long. The five sepals and petals are white or pink, more or less round and 1 mm (0.039 in) long. There are five stamens opposite the sepals. Flowering occurs from April to October.

== Taxonomy ==
Thryptomene elliottii was first formally described in 1875 by Ferdinand von Mueller in Fragmenta phytographiae Australiae from specimens collected by Ernest Giles. The specific epithet (elliottii) honours William Elliott, a horticultural writer of the period.

== Distribution and habitat ==
This thryptomene grows in sandy soils, sometimes in woodland or spinifex grassland along the Transcontinental railway between Loonganaa in Western Australia and Wynbring in South Australia and as far north as the Musgrave Ranges.

== Conservation status ==
Thryptomene elliottii is classified as "not threatened" by the Western Australian Government Department of Parks and Wildlife.
