= Thryptomene johnsonii =

Conservation status
- Priority Two — Poorly Known Taxa (DEC)

Scientific classification
- Kingdom: Plantae
- Clade: Tracheophytes
- Clade: Angiosperms
- Clade: Eudicots
- Clade: Rosids
- Order: Myrtales
- Family: Myrtaceae
- Genus: Thryptomene
- Species: T. johnsonii

Binomial name
- Thryptomene johnsonii F.Muell.

Species of shrub

Thryptomene johnsonii is a species of flowering plant in the family Myrtaceae and is endemic to a restricted area of Western Australia. It is a bushy shrub with rigid branches, egg-shaped leaves with the narrower end towards the base and pink flowers with five petals and usually eight stamens.

== Description ==
Thryptomene johnsonii is a bushy shrub that typically grows to a height of up to 2 m (6 ft 7 in) and has rigid branches. Its leaves are mostly egg-shaped with the narrower end towards the base, 1.7–3.4 mm (0.067–0.134 in) long and about 1.5 mm (0.059 in) wide on a petiole 0.4–0.5 mm (0.016–0.020 in) long. The flowers are usually arranged singly in leaf axils in pairs of up to four near the ends of branchlets, each flower on a peduncle 0.4–0.7 mm (0.016–0.028 in) long with egg-shaped bracteoles 1.5–2 mm (0.059–0.079 in) long. The flowers are 6–7 mm (0.24–0.28 in) in diameter with five broadly egg-shaped sepals and five more or less round, pink petals about 2.5 mm (0.098 in) long. There are usually eight, irregularly arranged stamens. Flowering has been observed in October.

== Taxonomy ==
Thryptomene johnsonii was first formally described in 1864 by Ferdinand von Mueller in Fragmenta phytographiae Australiae from specimens collected near the Murchison River. The specific epithet (johnsonii) honours William Johnson (1825–1887) who studied the medicinal properties of the Myrtaceae.

== Distribution and habitat ==
This thryptomene grows in sand on a sandplain slope in the Kalbarri National Park.

== Conservation status ==
Thryptomene johnsonii is classified as "Priority Two" by the Western Australian Government Department of Parks and Wildlife meaning that it is poorly known and from only one or a few locations.
