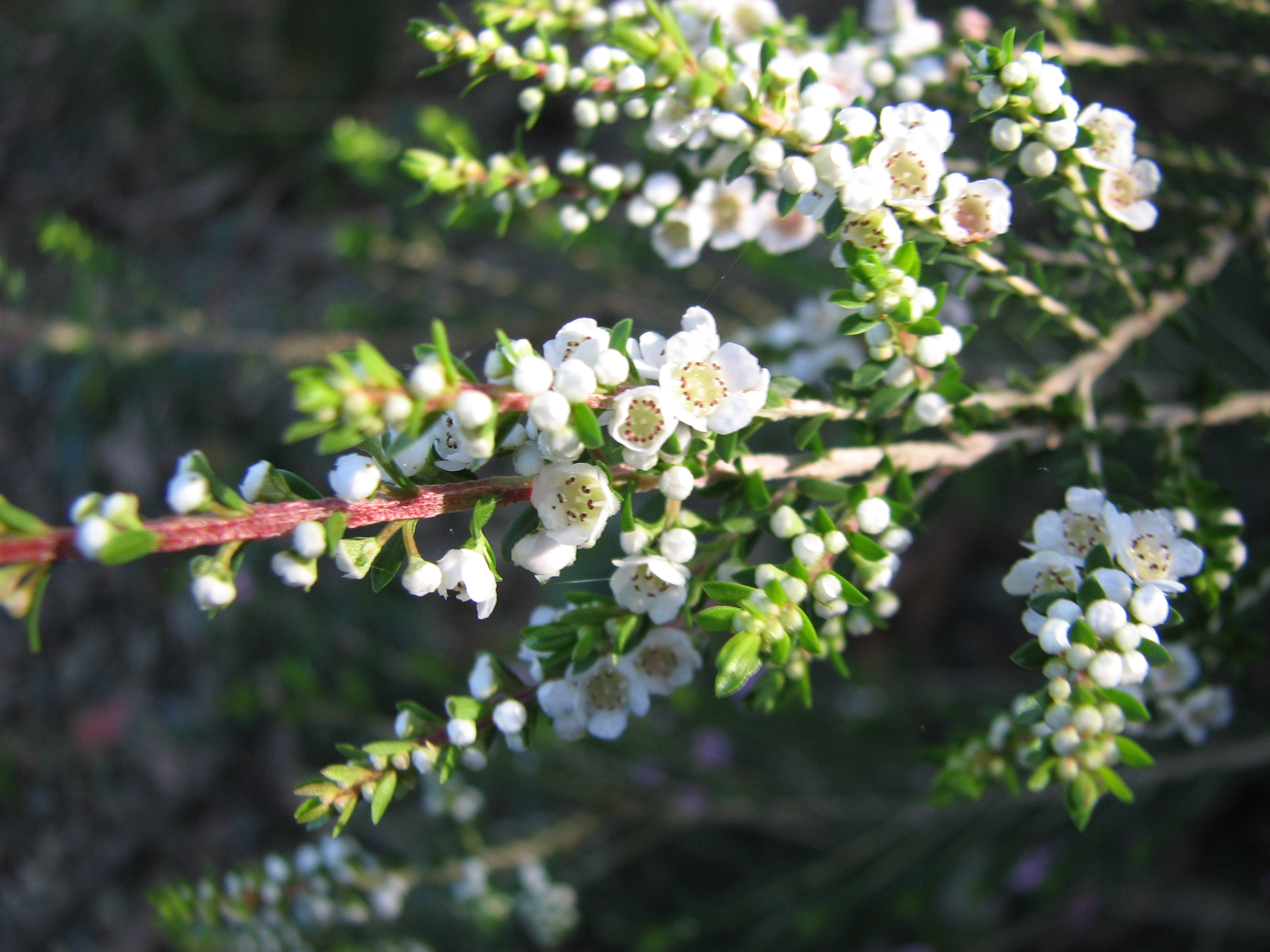
- In Maranoa Gardens

Scientific classification
- Kingdom: Plantae
- Clade: Tracheophytes
- Clade: Angiosperms
- Clade: Eudicots
- Clade: Rosids
- Order: Myrtales
- Family: Myrtaceae
- Genus: Thryptomene
- Species: T. hyporhytis

Binomial name
- Thryptomene hyporhytis Turcz.

= Thryptomene hyporhytis =

Species of shrub

Thryptomene hyporhytis is a shrub species in the family Myrtaceae and is endemic to the south-west of Western Australia. It grows to between 0.2 and 0.7 metres high and produces white or pink flowers between June and October in the species' native range. It was first formally described in 1862 by Nikolai Turczaninow in Bulletin de la Société Impériale des Naturalistes de Moscou. The specific epithet (hyporhytis) means "under wrinkle", referring to the ribbed floral cup.
