= Thryptomene globifera =

Scientific classification
- Kingdom: Plantae
- Clade: Tracheophytes
- Clade: Angiosperms
- Clade: Eudicots
- Clade: Rosids
- Order: Myrtales
- Family: Myrtaceae
- Genus: Thryptomene
- Species: T. globifera

Binomial name
- Thryptomene globifera Rye

Species of shrub

Thryptomene globifera is a species of flowering plant in the family Myrtaceae and is endemic to western areas of Western Australia. It is a shrub with crowded, upward-pointing, broadly egg-shaped leaves with the narrower end towards the base, and pale pink or mauve flowers with ten stamens.

== Description ==
Thryptomene globifera is shrub that typically grows to 0.4–1.2 m (1 ft 4 in – 3 ft 11 in) high and 0.6–1.5 mm (0.024–0.059 in) wide. Its leaves are upward-pointing or pressed against the stem, broadly egg-shaped with the lower end towards the base, 1.3–2.3 mm (0.051–0.091 in) long and 1.5–2.2 mm (0.059–0.087 in) wide on a petiole up to 0.3 mm (0.012 in) long. The flowers are arranged in clusters at the ends of branchlets, each cluster with up to six pairs of flowers on peduncles up to 0.3 mm (0.012 in) long with bracteoles 1.5–2.2 mm (0.059–0.087 in) long that remain until the fruit is shed. The flowers are 5–7 mm (0.20–0.28 in) in diameter with sepals 1.1–1.5 mm (0.043–0.059 in) long. The petals are pale pink or mauve, 2.5–3.3 mm (0.098–0.130 in) long and there are usually ten stamens. Flowering occurs from August to October.

== Taxonomy ==
Thryptomene globifera was first formally described in 2014 by Barbara Lynette Rye in the journal Nuytsia from specimens collected near Indarra in 2003. The specific epithet (globifera) means "sphere-bearing", referring to the flower clusters.

== Distribution and habitat ==
This thryptomene grows in woodland in sandy soil between the Eurardy Reserve, Ajana and Mullewa in the Avon Wheatbelt, Geraldton Sandplains and Yalgoo biogeographic regions.

== Conservation status ==
Thryptomene globifera is classified as "not threatened" by the Western Australian Government Department of Parks and Wildlife.
