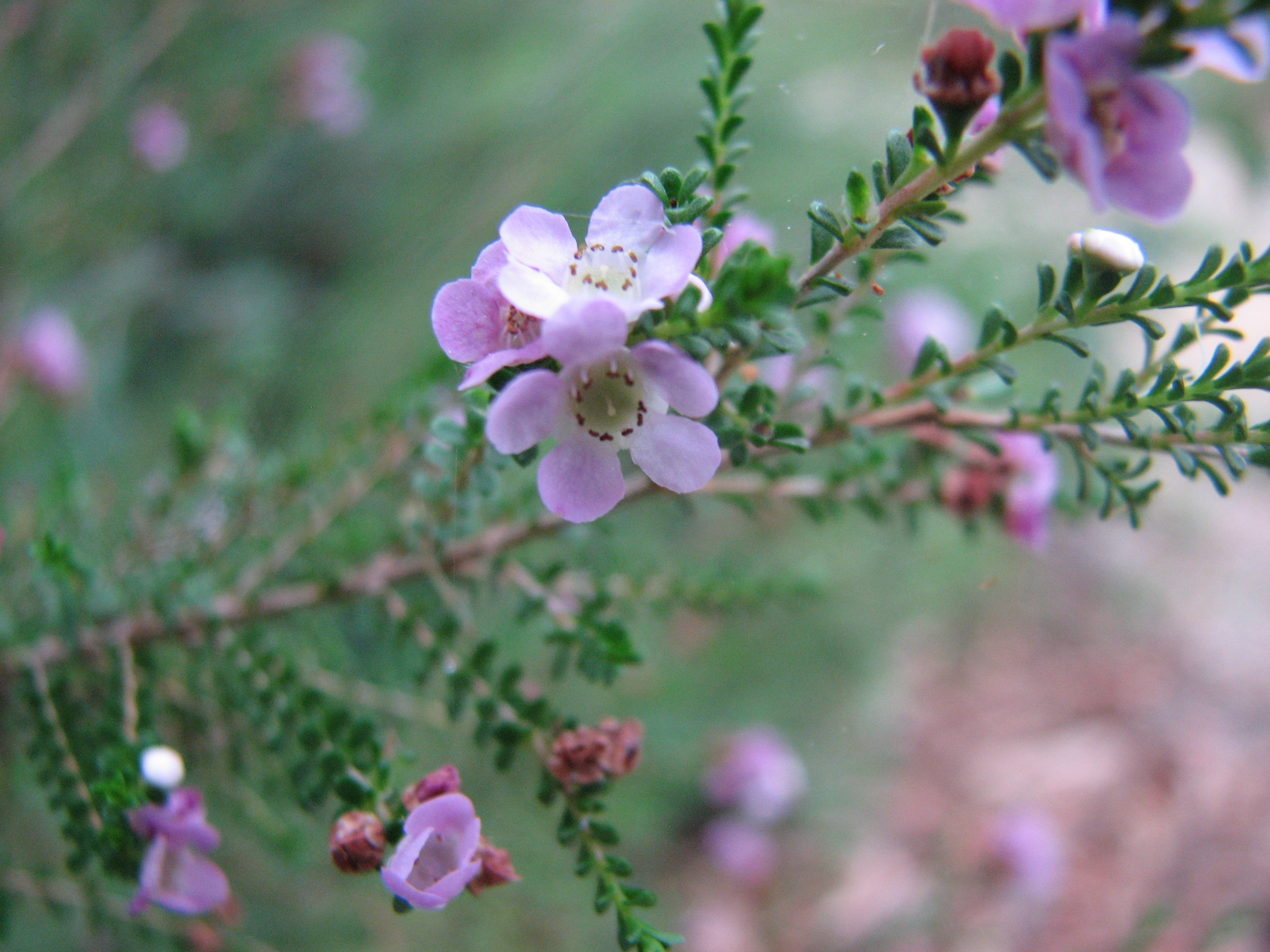
- In Maranoa Gardens

Scientific classification
- Kingdom: Plantae
- Clade: Tracheophytes
- Clade: Angiosperms
- Clade: Eudicots
- Clade: Rosids
- Order: Myrtales
- Family: Myrtaceae
- Genus: Thryptomene
- Species: T. baeckeacea

Binomial name
- Thryptomene baeckeacea F.Muell.

= Thryptomene baeckeacea =

Species of shrub

Thryptomene baeckeacea is a species of flowering plant in the family Myrtaceae and is endemic to Western Australia. It is a shrub that typically grows to a height of 0.2–1.2 m (7.9 in – 3 ft 11.2 in) and produces white, pink or purple flowers between May and October in the species' native range. It was first formally described in 1864 by Ferdinand von Mueller in Fragmenta phytographiae Australiae from specimens collected by Augustus Oldfield near the Murchison River.
