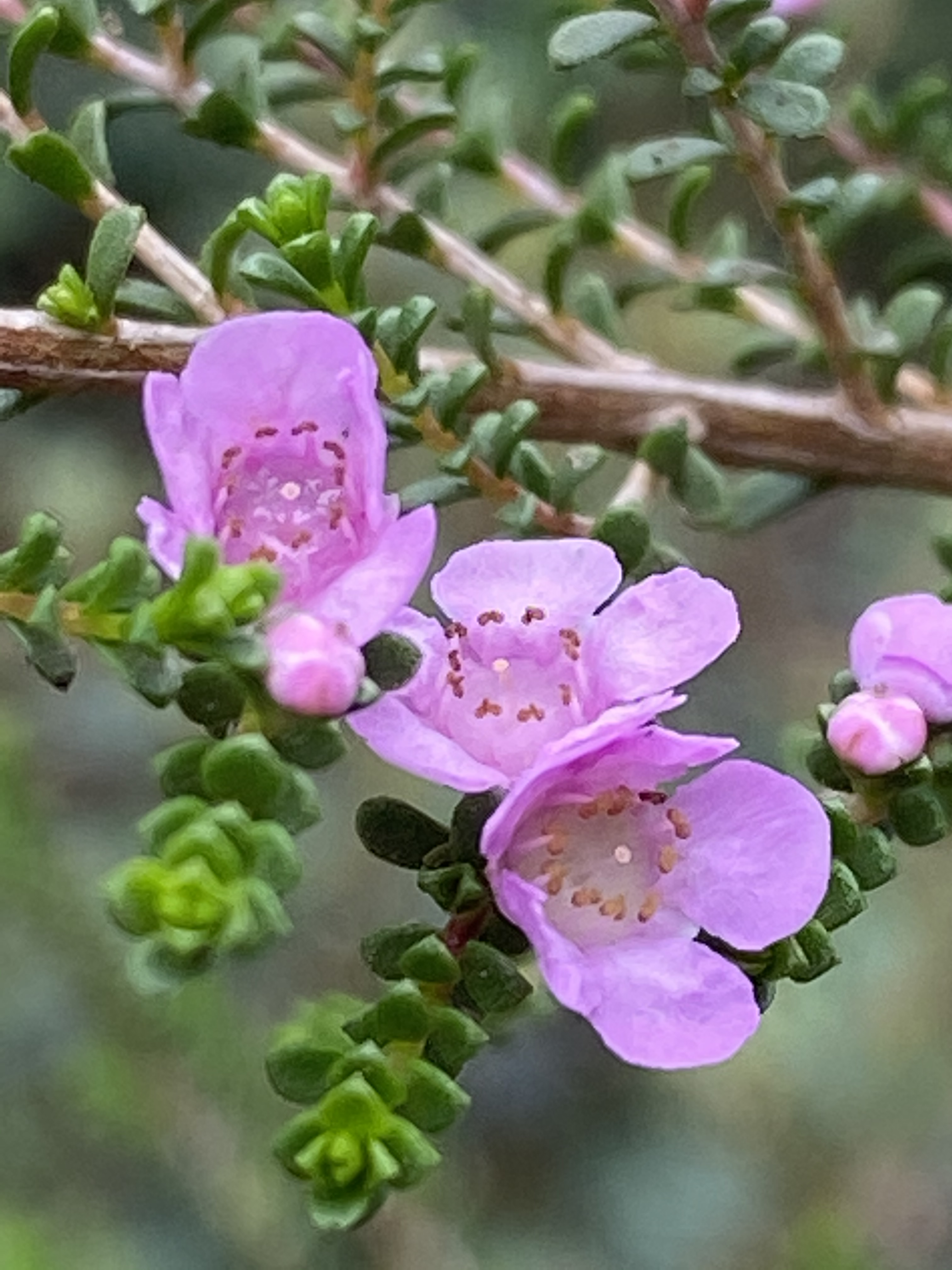

Scientific classification
- Kingdom: Plantae
- Clade: Embryophytes
- Clade: Tracheophytes
- Clade: Spermatophytes
- Clade: Angiosperms
- Clade: Eudicots
- Clade: Rosids
- Order: Myrtales
- Family: Myrtaceae
- Genus: Thryptomene
- Species: T. denticulata

Binomial name
- Thryptomene denticulata (F.Muell.) Benth.

= Thryptomene denticulata =

Species of shrub

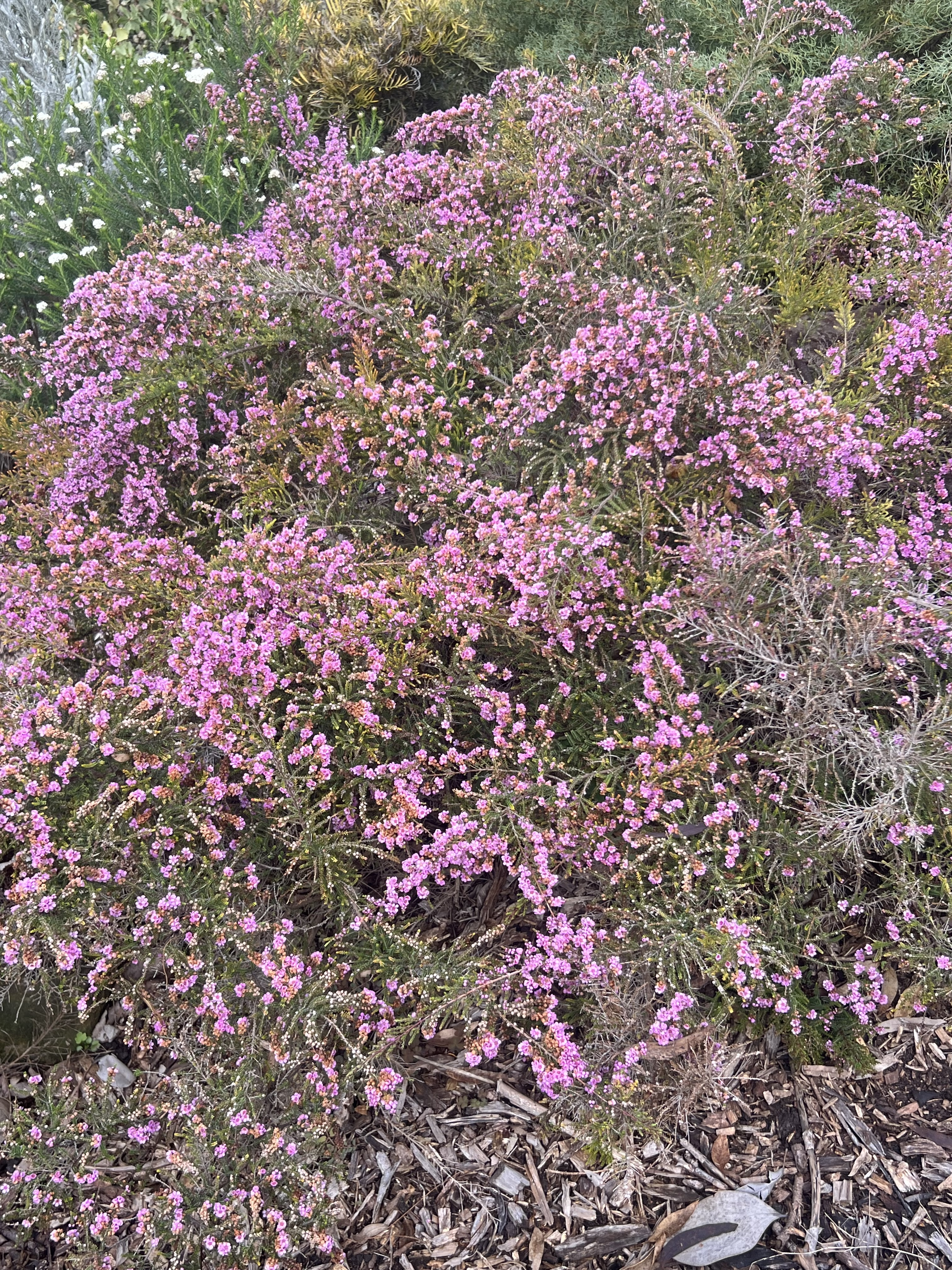
Habit

Thryptomene denticulata is a flowering shrub species in the family Myrtaceae that is endemic to Western Australia.

The erect shrub typically grows to a height of 0.4 to 1.5 metres (1 to 5 ft) in height. It blooms between May and November producing purple-pink flowers. It generally grows to a width of about 1 metre (3 ft) and has tiny leaves.

It is found on sand plains in the Mid West, Gascoyne and Wheatbelt regions of Western Australia between Shark Bay and Wongan Hills where it grows in sandy soils.

The plant is quite drought tolerant once it has become established. It will grow well in full sun or in part shade. The leaves can be eaten by caterpillars and the plant has a lifespan of five to ten years.

The species was initially described as Scholtzia denticulata in 1864 by the botanist Ferdinand von Mueller in the work Fragmenta Phytographiae Australiae from specimens collected near the Murchison River by Augustus Oldfield. In 1867 it was reclassified into the genus Thryptomene as Thryptomene denticulata by George Bentham in Flora Australiensis.
