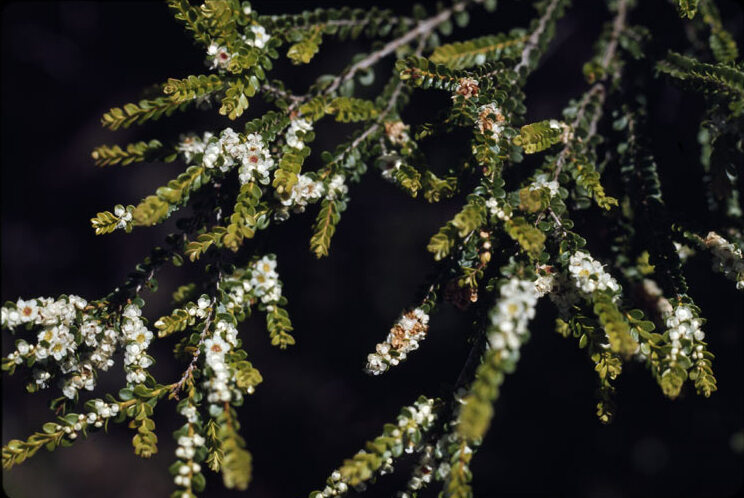

Scientific classification
- Kingdom: Plantae
- Clade: Tracheophytes
- Clade: Angiosperms
- Clade: Eudicots
- Clade: Rosids
- Order: Myrtales
- Family: Myrtaceae
- Genus: Thryptomene
- Species: T. oligandra

Binomial name
- Thryptomene oligandra F.Muell.

Synonyms
- Thryptomene oligandra F.Muell. var. oligandra

= Thryptomene oligandra =

Species of flowering plant

Thryptomene oligandra is a species of flowering plant in the family Myrtaceae and is endemic to northern Queensland. It is a shrub, sometimes a small tree, with decussate, egg-shaped leaves with the narrower end towards the base, and flowers with five petals and five stamens.

== Description ==
Thryptomene oligandra is a shrub that typically grows to a height of 1–5 cm (0.39–1.97 in), sometimes a poorly-formed tree. Its leaves are decussate, egg-shaped with the narrower end towards the base, 3–5 mm (0.12–0.20 in) long and 1.5–3 mm (0.059–0.118 in) wide. The flowers are more or less sessile, arranged in small clusters of three flowers in leaf axils near the ends of the branches. The sepals and petals are similar to each other, the petals about 1.5–2 mm (0.059–0.079 in) long. The five stamens are red or purple and the centre of the flower is yellow.

== Taxonomy ==
Thryptomene oligandra was first formally described in 1858 by Ferdinand von Mueller in the Fragmenta phytographiae Australiae from specimens collected near the Gilbert River. The specific epithet (oligandra) means "few stamens".

== Distribution and habitat ==
This thryptomene grows in heath, forest and vine thickets on Cape York Peninsula and in north-east Queensland.

== Conservation status ==
Thryptomene oligandra is classified as of "least concern" under the Queensland Government Nature Conservation Act 1992.

== Indigenous use ==
The stems of T. oligandra were sometimes used for the ends of reed-spears on the Mitchell and Gilbert Rivers.
