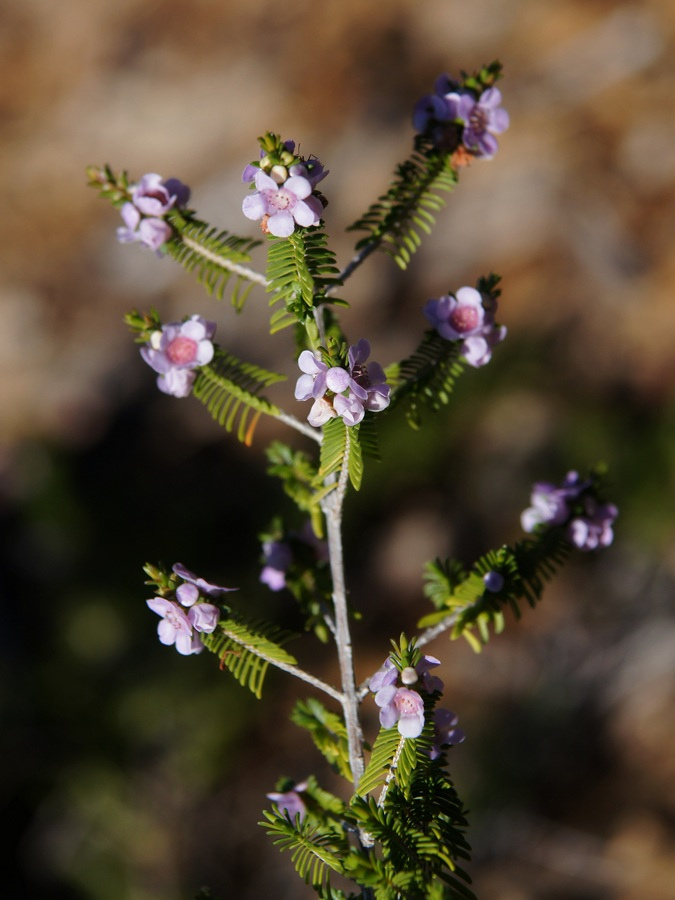
- Thryptomene stenophylla

Conservation status
- Priority Two — Poorly Known Taxa (DEC)

Scientific classification
- Kingdom: Plantae
- Clade: Tracheophytes
- Clade: Angiosperms
- Clade: Eudicots
- Clade: Rosids
- Order: Myrtales
- Family: Myrtaceae
- Genus: Thryptomene
- Species: T. stenophylla

Binomial name
- Thryptomene stenophylla E.Pritz.

= Thryptomene stenophylla =

Species of shrub

Thryptomene stenophylla is a shrub species in the family Myrtaceae that is endemic to Western Australia.

The spreading shrub typically grows to a height of 0.3 to 1.2 metres (1 to 4 ft). It blooms between June and August producing pink-purple flowers.

It is found on sand plains and hills in the Mid West region of Western Australia between Geraldton and Northampton where it grows in sandy to loamy soils over limestone.
