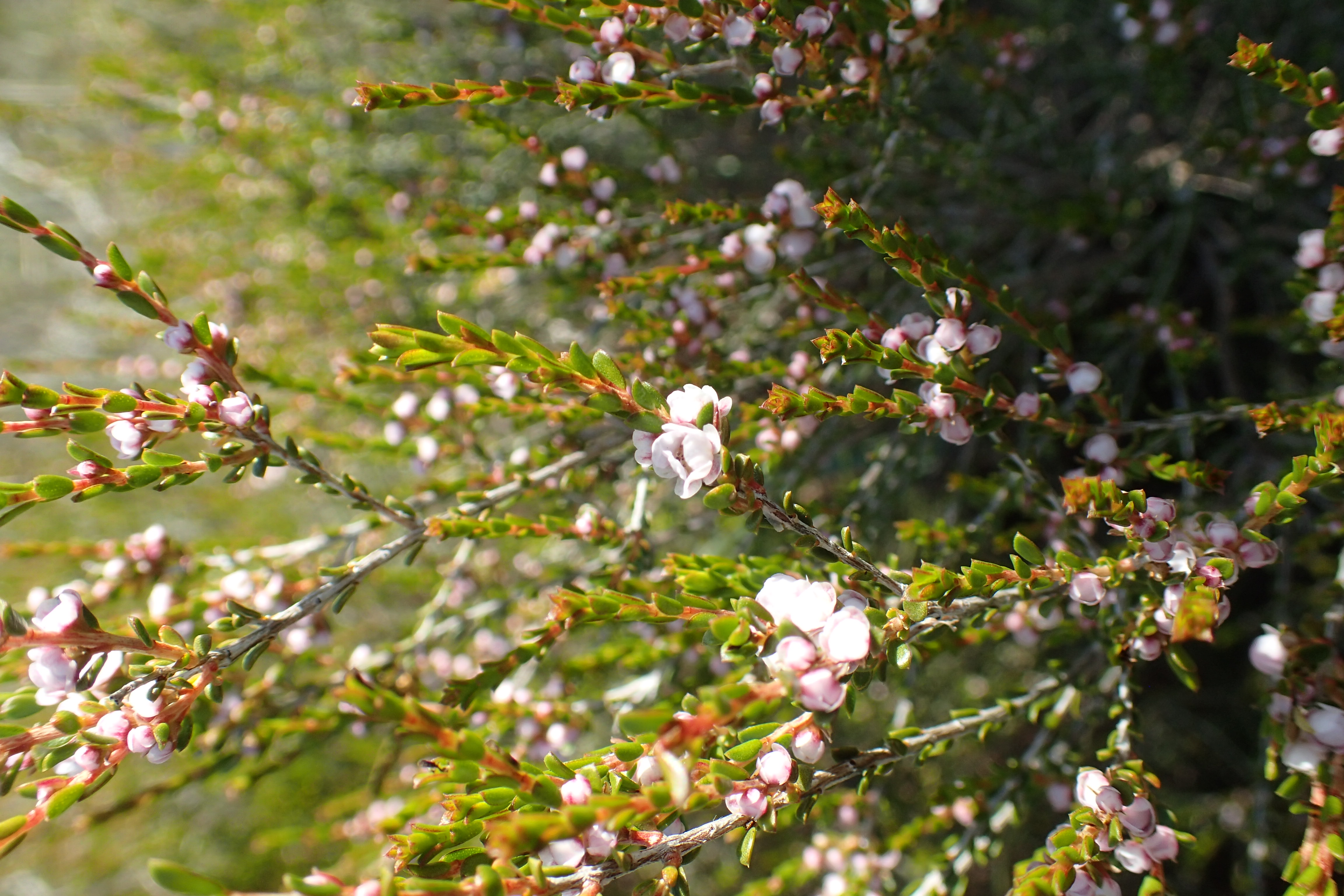
- Near Gingin

Scientific classification
- Kingdom: Plantae
- Clade: Tracheophytes
- Clade: Angiosperms
- Clade: Eudicots
- Clade: Rosids
- Order: Myrtales
- Family: Myrtaceae
- Genus: Thryptomene
- Species: T. mucronulata

Binomial name
- Thryptomene mucronulata Turcz.

= Thryptomene mucronulata =

Species of shrub

Thryptomene mucronulata is a species of flowering plant in the family Myrtaceae and is endemic to Western Australia. It is an erect shrub with upward-pointing, overlapping, egg-shaped leaves with the narrower end towards the base and pink flowers with five petals and ten stamens.

== Description ==
Thryptomene mucronulata is usually an erect shrub that typically grows to a height of 0.5–2 m (1 ft 8 in – 6 ft 7 in). Its leaves are upward-pointing, overlapping, and egg-shaped with the narrower end towards the base, 2.8–7 mm (0.11–0.28 in) long and 0.9–1.8 mm (0.035–0.071 in) wide on a petiole 0.5–0.8 mm (0.020–0.031 in) long. The leaves have prominent oil glands and sometimes toothed edges. The flowers are arranged in pairs in up to nine of the upper leaf axils of branchlets, each flower on a peduncle 0.7–1.9 mm (0.028–0.075 in) long with egg-shaped bracteoles 1.8–2.5 mm (0.071–0.098 in) long that remain on the plant until the fruit is shed. The flowers are 4.5–6 mm (0.18–0.24 in) in diameter with five egg-shaped to almost round, pale pink sepals 1.2–1.7 mm (0.047–0.067 in) long. The petals are a darker shade of pink, about 1.5–2.5 mm (0.059–0.098 in) long and there are ten stamens. Flowering occurs from June to November and the fruit is a capsule 1.5–2 mm (0.059–0.079 in) long.

== Taxonomy ==
Thryptomene mucronulata was first formally described in 1847 by Nikolai Turczaninow in Bulletin de la Société Impériale des Naturalistes de Moscou from specimens collected by James Drummond. The specific epithet (mucronulata) means "having a short, sharp point".

== Distribution and habitat ==
This thryptomene grows among rock outcrops and in winter-wet places near swamps and watercourses between Mullewa, Gingin and Wyalkatchem in the Avon Wheatbelt, Geraldton Sandplains, Jarrah Forest and Swan Coastal Plain biogeographic regions of south-western Western Australia.

== Conservation status ==
Thryptomene mucronulata is classified as "not threatened" by the Western Australian Government Department of Parks and Wildlife.
