= Thryptomene ericaea =

Scientific classification
- Kingdom: Plantae
- Clade: Tracheophytes
- Clade: Angiosperms
- Clade: Eudicots
- Clade: Rosids
- Order: Myrtales
- Family: Myrtaceae
- Genus: Thryptomene
- Species: T. ericaea

Binomial name
- Thryptomene ericaea F.Muell.

Species of shrub

Thryptomene ericaea is a species of flowering plant in the family Myrtaceae and is endemic to South Australia. It is a shrub with narrow elliptic leaves and white flowers with five petals and five stamens.

== Description ==
Thryptomene ericaea is a shrub that typically grows to a height of 0.5–1.2 m (1 ft 8 in – 3 ft 11 in). Its leaves are narrow elliptic with a pointed tip, about 6 mm (0.24 in) long, 1 mm (0.039 in) wide and sessile. Each flower is on a peduncle 2–3 mm (0.079–0.118 in) long and has a ribbed, more or less cylindrical floral cup. The flowers have five white, egg-shaped sepals and petals, all about 1 mm (0.039 in) long and there are five stamens opposite the sepals. Flowering occurs from September to December.

== Taxonomy ==
Thryptomene ericaea was first formally described in 1858 by Ferdinand von Mueller in Fragmenta phytographiae Australiae from specimens collected by "Bannier" on Kangaroo Island. The specific epithet (ericaea) refers to a resemblance of this species to plants in the genus Erica.

== Distribution ==
This thryptomene occurs in South Australia, on Kangaroo Island and to a lesser extent on the Eyre and Yorke Peninsulas.

== Cultivation ==
A cultivar of T. ericaea known as 'Centenary Starburst' was chosen as South Australia's floral emblem for the Centenary of Federation (1901–2001). This cultivar has commercial potential for the cut flower industry but the species is difficult to propagate. Research on inducing root formation in tissue culture has been conducted.
