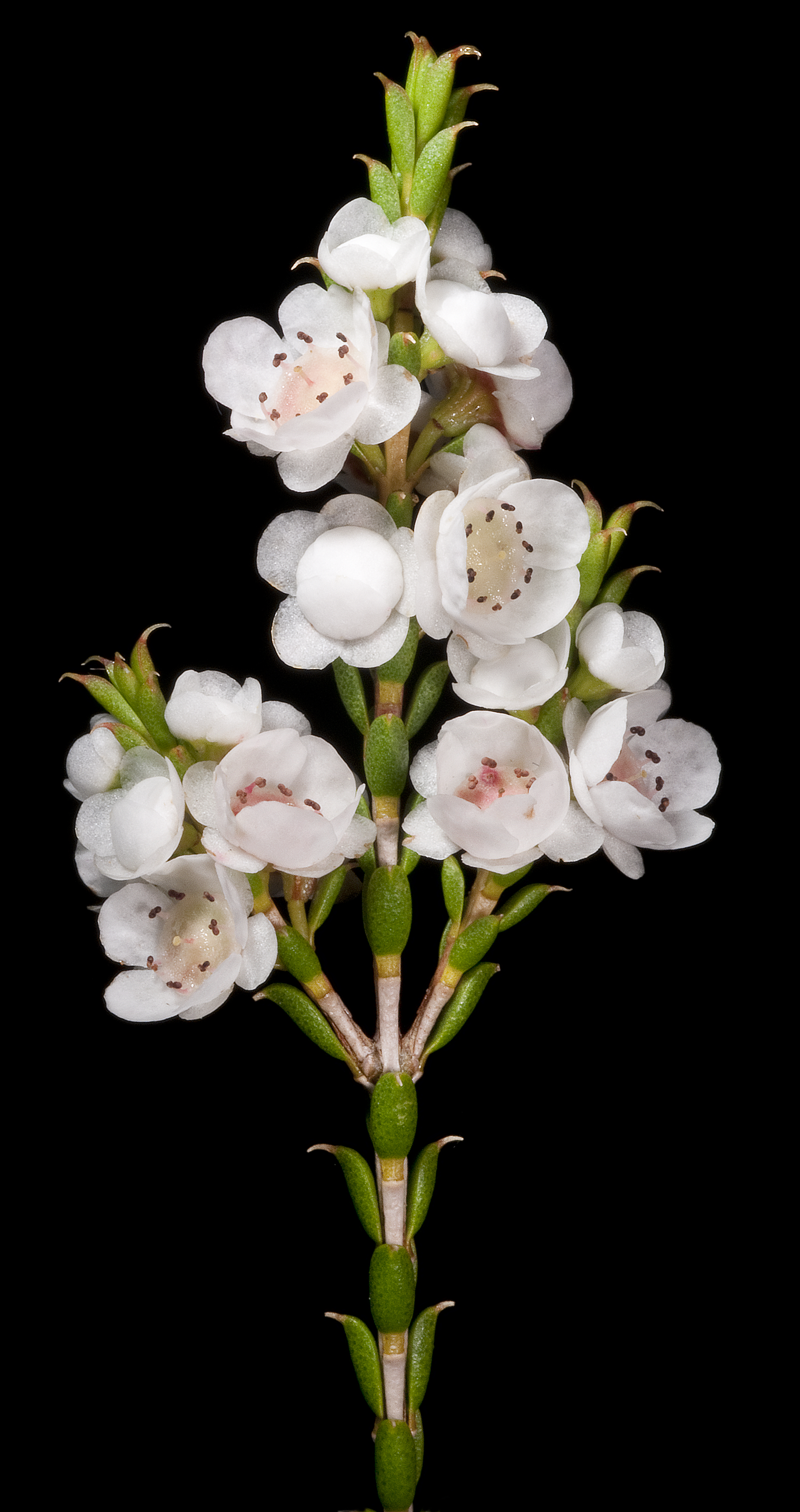

Scientific classification
- Kingdom: Plantae
- Clade: Tracheophytes
- Clade: Angiosperms
- Clade: Eudicots
- Clade: Rosids
- Order: Myrtales
- Family: Myrtaceae
- Genus: Thryptomene
- Species: T. australis

Binomial name
- Thryptomene australis Endl.

= Thryptomene australis =

Hook-leaf thryptomene

Species of flowering plant

Thryptomene australis, commonly known as hook-leaf thryptomene, is a species of flowering plant in the family Myrtaceae and is endemic to the south-west of Western Australia. It is an erect, bushy and spreading shrub with upward-pointing leaves with the tip curving outwards, and flowers with white petals arranged spike-like near the ends of the branchlets.

== Description ==
Thryptomene australis is an erect, bushy and spreading shrub that typically grows to a height of 0.8–3.5 m (2 ft 7 in – 11 ft 6 in) with upwards-pointing leaves with the tip curving outwards. The leaves are linear to narrow egg-shaped with the narrower end towards the base, 4–7 mm (0.16–0.28 in) long and 0.5–1.2 mm (0.020–0.047 in) wide on a petiole 0.7–1 mm (0.028–0.039 in) long. The flowers are arranged in pairs in up to eleven leaf axils near the end of branchlets. The flowers are 6–7 mm (0.24–0.28 in) diameter with egg-shaped to broadly elliptic white or pale pink sepals about 1.4 mm (0.055 in) long and 1.6–2.0 mm (0.063–0.079 in) wide. The petals are white, broadly egg-shaped, 2.0–2.4 mm (0.079–0.094 in) long, and there are seven to ten stamens. Flowering mainly occurs between July and November and the fruit is a nut about 2.5 mm (0.098 in) long and wide.

== Taxonomy ==
Thryptomene australis was first formally described in 1838 by Stephan Ladislaus Endlicher in Stirpium Australasicarum Herbarii Hugeliani Decades Tres, published in the journal Annalen des Wiener Museums der Naturgeschichte and was the first species of Thryptomene described. The specific epithet (australis) means "southern".

In 2001, Barbara Lynette Rye and Malcolm Eric Trudgen described two subspecies in the journal Nuytsia and the names are accepted by the Australian Plant Census:

- Thryptomene australis Endl. subsp. australis has eight to twelve stamens on filaments usually longer than 0.8 mm (0.031 in);
- Thryptomene australis subsp. brachyandra Rye & Trudgen has seven to ten stamens on filaments usually shorter than 0.6 mm (0.024 in).

== Distribution and habitat ==
Both subspecies of hook-leaf thryptomene are widely distributed in the south-west of Western Australia where they mainly grow on granite outcrops but also on plains, around salt lakes and creeklines and in firebreaks in gravelly, sandy, clay or loamy soils. The species occurs in the Avon Wheatbelt, Esperance Plains, Mallee and Coolgardie biogeographic regions but subsp. australis is mostly absent from the last of these.

== Conservation status ==
Both subspecies of Thryptomene australis are list as "not threatened" by the Western Australian Government Department of Parks and Wildlife.
