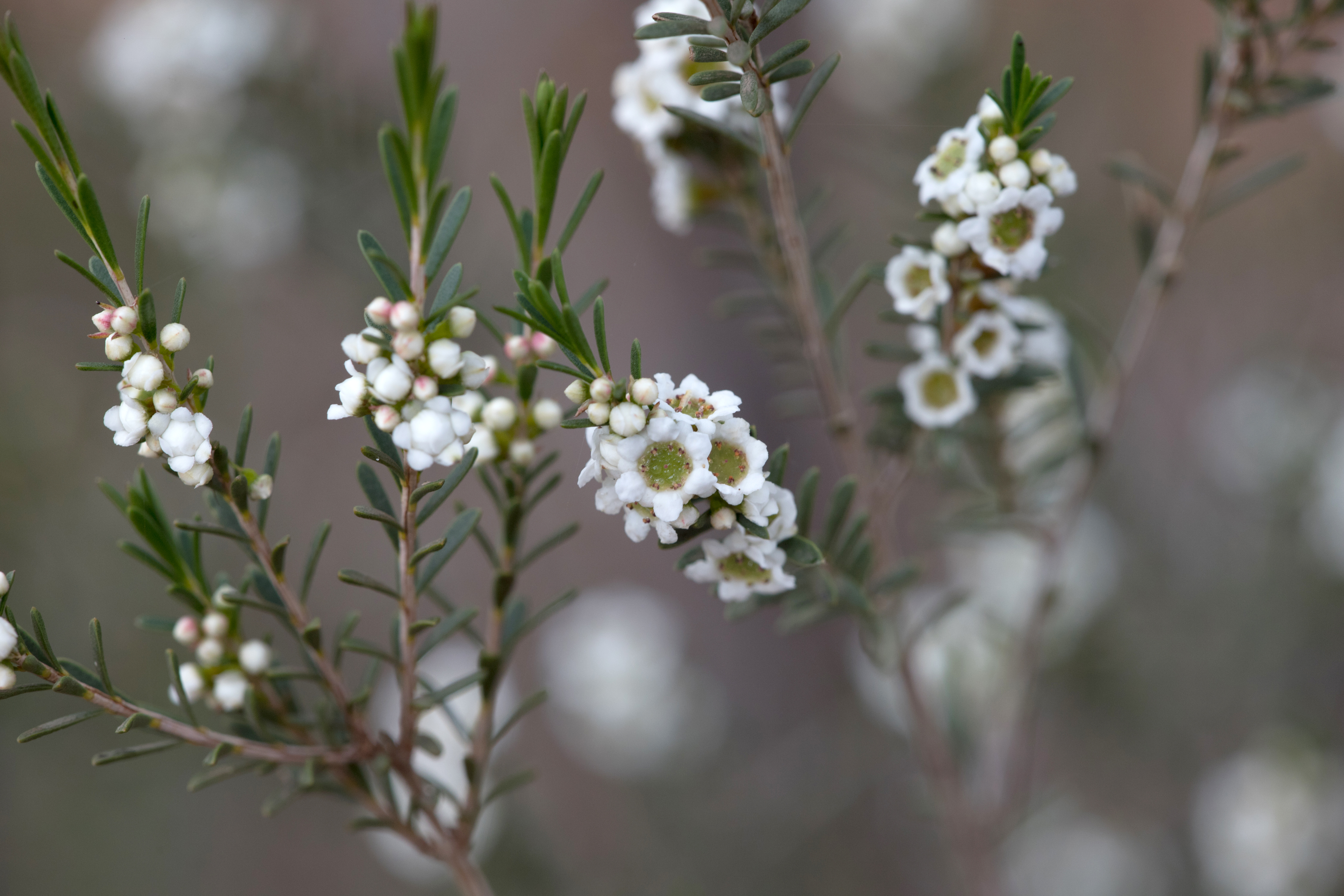
- Near Bourke

Conservation status
- Vulnerable (EPBC Act)

Scientific classification
- Kingdom: Plantae
- Clade: Tracheophytes
- Clade: Angiosperms
- Clade: Eudicots
- Clade: Rosids
- Order: Myrtales
- Family: Myrtaceae
- Genus: Thryptomene
- Species: T. hexandra

Binomial name
- Thryptomene hexandra C.T.White

= Thryptomene hexandra =

Species of shrub

Thryptomene hexandra, commonly known as Palm Valley myrtle in the Northern Territory, is a species of flowering plant in the family Myrtaceae and is endemic to north-eastern Australia. It is an erect, much-branched shrub with linear to lance-shaped leaves and white flowers with six stamens.

== Description ==
Thryptomene hexandra is an erect, much-branched, glabrous shrub that typically grows to a height of 1–2.5 m (3 ft 3 in – 8 ft 2 in). The leaves are decussate, linear to lance-shaped or narrow egg-shaped with the narrower end towards the base, 5–6 mm (0.20–0.24 in) long, 1.0–1.5 mm (0.039–0.059 in) wide and scented when crushed. The flowers are arranged singly, sometimes in pairs or threes in leaf axils near the ends of branches, on peduncles up to 0.7 mm (0.028 in) long, each with two linear bracteoles 1–1.5 mm (0.039–0.059 in) long. The flowers have six, more or less round white sepals and petals and six stamens. Flowering occurs in most months, but especially from June to September.

== Taxonomy and naming ==
Thryptomene hexandra was first formally described in 1944 by Cyril Tenison White in Proceedings of the Royal Society of Queensland. The specific epithet (hexandra) means "six stamens".

== Distribution and habitat ==
This thryptomene occurs in New South Wales, Queensland and the Northern Territory. It grows in woodland on stony hills north from Bourke in New South Wales and in deep, narrow gorges in the southern part of the Northern Territory.

== Conservation status ==
This species is listed as "vulnerable " under the Australian Government Environment Protection and Biodiversity Conservation Act 1999 and as "near threatened" under the Northern Territory Government Territory Parks and Wildlife Conservation Act 1976, but as of "least concern" under the Queensland Government Nature Conservation Act 1992.
