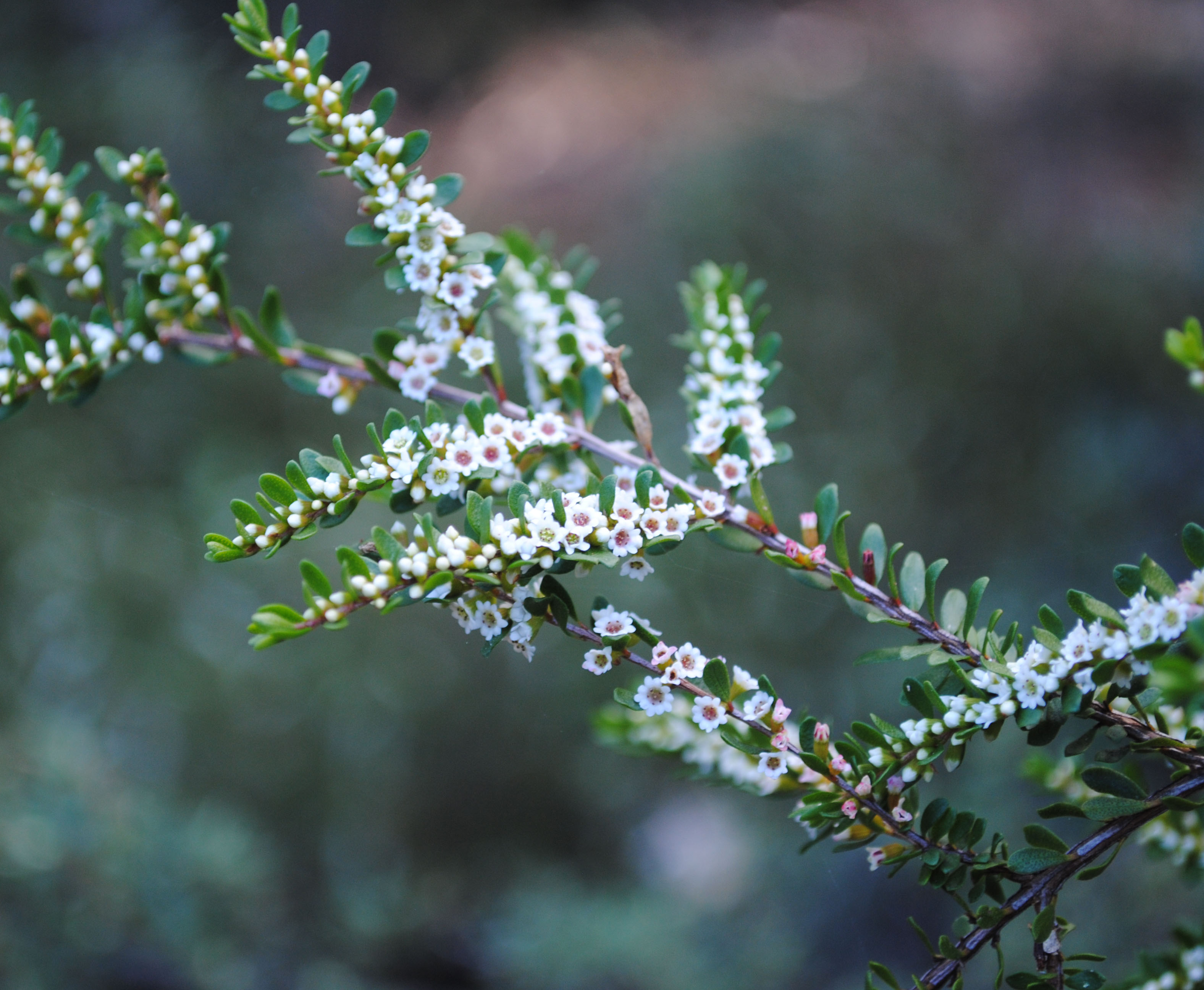
- Thryptomene micrantha on Freycinet Peninsula

Scientific classification
- Kingdom: Plantae
- Clade: Tracheophytes
- Clade: Angiosperms
- Clade: Eudicots
- Clade: Rosids
- Order: Myrtales
- Family: Myrtaceae
- Genus: Thryptomene
- Species: T. micrantha

Binomial name
- Thryptomene micrantha Hook.f.

Synonyms
- Thryptomene miqueliana F.Muell.; Tryptomene miqueliana F.Muell. orth. var.

= Thryptomene micrantha =

Ribbed thryptomene

Species of plant

Thryptomene micrantha, commonly known as ribbed thryptomene, is a species of flowering plant in the family Myrtaceae and is endemic to south-eastern Australia. It is a spreading to erect shrub with egg-shaped leaves, the narrower end towards the base, and white flowers with five petals and five stamens.

== Description ==
Thryptomene micrantha is a woody, spreading to erect shrub that typically grows to a height of 0.3–1.5 m (1 ft 0 in – 4 ft 11 in) and has crowded leaves, egg-shaped with the narrower end towards the base, arranged in opposite pairs, each leaf 4–6 mm (0.16–0.24 in) long and 1–2.5 mm (0.039–0.098 in) wide on a short petiole. The flowers are arranged in upper leaf axils, singly or in groups of up to three, each flower on a pedicel about 1 mm (0.039 in) long. The floral cup is cylindrical with then longitudinal ridges and the five sepals are egg-shaped, 1–2 mm (0.039–0.079 in) long. The five petals are white, egg-shaped, about 1 mm (0.039 in) long and there are five stamens. Flowering mainly occurs from August to October.

== Taxonomy and naming ==
Thryptomene micrantha was first formally described in 1853 by English botanist Joseph Dalton Hooker in Hooker's Journal of Botany and Kew Garden Miscellany. His description was based on a collection made by Ronald Campbell Gunn from plants growing on "banks of sand and oyster-shells" on Schouten Island off Tasmania's east coast. The specific epithet (micrantha) means "small-flowered".

== Distribution and habitat ==
Ribbed thryptomene occurs in scattered populations in South Australia, Victoria and Tasmania, growing in heath or woodland, sometimes in shrubland on rocky slopes. In Victoria it occurs in the region of the Gippsland Lakes, while in Tasmania populations are mostly confined to the Freycinet National Park. In South Australia it is found mainly on the Eyre and Yorke peninsulas.

== Conservation status ==
In Tasmania this species is listed as "vulnerable" under the Threatened Species Protection Act 1995, and in Victoria as "rare" on the Department of Sustainability and Environment's Advisory List of Rare Or Threatened Plants In Victoria.
