= Thryptomene urceolaris =

Scientific classification
- Kingdom: Plantae
- Clade: Tracheophytes
- Clade: Angiosperms
- Clade: Eudicots
- Clade: Rosids
- Order: Myrtales
- Family: Myrtaceae
- Genus: Thryptomene
- Species: T. urceolaris

Binomial name
- Thryptomene urceolaris F.Muell.

Species of shrub

Thryptomene urceolaris is a shrub species in the family Myrtaceae that is endemic to Western Australia.

The shrub typically grows to a height of 0.3 to 1.3 metres (1 to 4 ft) and sometimes as high as 3 metres (10 ft). It blooms between July and October producing pink-white flowers.

It is found on undulating plains Goldfields-Esperance regione of Western Australia in a large area centred around Kalgoorlie where it grows in sandy soils.
