= Thryptomene strongylophylla =

Scientific classification
- Kingdom: Plantae
- Clade: Tracheophytes
- Clade: Angiosperms
- Clade: Eudicots
- Clade: Rosids
- Order: Myrtales
- Family: Myrtaceae
- Genus: Thryptomene
- Species: T. strongylophylla

Binomial name
- Thryptomene strongylophylla Benth.

Species of shrub

Thryptomene strongylophylla is a shrub species in the family Myrtaceae that is endemic to Western Australia.

The straggly shrub typically grows to a height of 0.4 to 1.0 metre (1 to 3 ft). It blooms between May and November producing pink-purple flowers.

It is found on sand plains and sand dunes in the Wheatbelt, Mid West and Gascoyne regions of Western Australia between Shark Bay and Carnamah where it grows in sandy soils.
