= Malcolm Eric Trudgen =

Australian botanist

Malcolm Eric Trudgen (born 1951) is a West Australian botanist. He has published some 105 botanical names. He currently runs his own consulting company, ME Trudgen and Associates.

He has worked in the Pilbara.

== Some publications ==
- Malcolm E Trudgen (1987). "Ochrosperma, a new genus of Myrtaceae (Leptospermeae, Baeckeinae) from New South Wales and Queensland". Nuytsia. 6 (1): 9–18. doi:10.58828/NUY00124. ISSN 0085-4417. Wikidata Q100730732.
- Trudgen, M.E. (1986). "Reinstatement and revision of Rinzia Schauer (Myrtaceae, Leptospermeae, Baeckeinae)". Nuytsia. 5: 415–439..
- Trudgen, M.E., & Griffin, E.A. (2001). A Flora, Vegetation and Floristic Survey of the Burrup Peninsula, Some Adjoining Areas and Part of the Dampier Archipelago with Comparisons to the Floristics of Areas on the Adjoining Mainland: Floristic Analysis of Vegetation Site Data from the Burrup Peninsula, Dolphin, Angel and Gidley Islands with Data from Cape Preston, the Chichester Ranges and Other Localities. ME Trudgen and Associates.
- Trudgen, M.E. (1984). A flora and vegetation survey of the Weeli Wolli Creek area. (Unpublished report prepared for the Mt Newman Mining Company.).
- Trudgen, M.E. & Casson, N. (1998). Flora and vegetation survey of Orebody A and Orebody B in the West Angelas Hill area, an area surrounding them, and of rail route options considered to link them to the existing Robe River Iron Associates rail line. (Unpublished report for Robe River Iron Associates.).
- Trudgen, M.E. (2002). A flora, vegetation and floristic survey of the Burrup Peninsula, some adjoining areas and part of the Dampier Archipelago, with comparisons to the floristic of areas on the adjacent mainland. (Unpublished report for the Department of Minerals & Petroleum Resources: Perth.).
- Rye, B.L. & Trudgen, M.E. (2008). "Seorsus a new Gondwanan genus of Myrtaceae with a disjunct distribution in Borneo and Australia" (PDF). Nuytsia. 18: 235–257.
- Barbara L. Rye; Malcolm E. Trudgen (2012). "Seven new combinations for Western Australian members of Myrtaceae tribe Chamelaucieae" (PDF). Nuytsia (in English and English). 22 (6): 393–398. doi:10.58828/NUY00651. ISSN 0085-4417. Wikidata Q98565601. Archived from the original (PDF) on 11 April 2018.
- M E Trudgen; B L Rye (2005). "Astus, a new Western Australian genus of Myrtaceae with heterocarpidic fruits" (PDF). Nuytsia. 15 (3): 495–512. doi:10.58828/NUY00430. ISSN 0085-4417. Wikidata Q100730234. Archived from the original (PDF) on 11 April 2018.

== Honours ==
- A daisy, Pilbara trudgenii, which he and Colma Keating discovered in 1985 east of Paraburdoo in the Hamersley Range and which has been named in his honour.
- Micromyrtus trudgenii, a Myrtaceae species,
- a wattle, Acacia trudgeniana (Trudgen's wattle) and
- a trigger plant, Stylidium trudgenii, also honour Trudgen, because it was he who drew attention the existence of these plants.

== Some published names ==
- Aluta Rye & Trudgen, Nuytsia 13(2): 347 (2000).
- Angasomyrtus Trudgen & Keighery, Nuytsia 4(3): 435 (1983). (not accepted, synonymous with Kunzea)
- Astartea granitica Rye & Trudgen, Nuytsia 23: 239 (2013).
- Astus Trudgen & Rye, Nuytsia 15(3): 502 (498-503) (2005).
- Enekbatus Trudgen & Rye, Nuytsia 20: 241 (-242) (2010).
- Ochrosperma Trudgen, Nuytsia 6(1): 11 (1987).
- Seorsus Rye & Trudgen, Nuytsia 18: 248 (-249) (2008).

== See also ==
- Category:Taxa named by Malcolm Eric Trudgen
