= Caladenia longicauda subsp. insularis =

Island white spider orchid

Conservation status
- Priority One — Poorly Known Taxa (DEC)

Scientific classification
- Kingdom: Plantae
- Clade: Tracheophytes
- Clade: Angiosperms
- Clade: Monocots
- Order: Asparagales
- Family: Orchidaceae
- Subfamily: Orchidoideae
- Tribe: Diurideae
- Genus: Caladenia
- Species: C. longicauda
- Subspecies: C. l. subsp. insularis

Trinomial name
- Caladenia longicauda subsp. insularis Hopper & A.P.Br. ex A.P.Br. & G.Brockman

Subspecies of orchid

Caladenia longicauda subsp. insularis, commonly known as the island white spider orchid, is a plant in the orchid family Orchidaceae and is endemic to the south-west of Western Australia. It has a single hairy leaf and up to four yellowish-white flowers with long, mostly spreading lateral sepals and petals. It is a relatively rare, self-pollinating subspecies and often flowers which are in bud, open and finished are seen on a single plant.

== Description ==
Caladenia longicauda subsp. insularis is a terrestrial, perennial, deciduous, herb with an underground tuber and which usually grows as solitary plants. It has a single hairy leaf, 60–200 mm (2–8 in) long and 5–12 mm (0.2–0.5 in) wide. Up to four yellowish-white flowers 80–100 mm (3–4 in) long and 70–90 mm (3–4 in) wide are borne on a spike 200–400 mm (8–20 in) tall. The dorsal sepal is erect, 40–60 mm (1.6–2.4 in) long and about 2 mm (0.08 in) wide. The lateral sepals are 40–60 mm (1.6–2.4 in) long and 2–4 mm (0.08–0.2 in) wide and the petals are 40–50 mm (2–2 in) long and about 2 mm (0.08 in) wide. The lateral sepals and petals spread widely near their bases but are then downcurved. The labellum is white, 10–15 mm (0.4–0.6 in) long and 5–7 mm (0.2–0.3 in) wide with narrow teeth up to 4 mm (0.2 in) long on the sides. There are four or more rows of pale red calli up to 1.5 mm (0.06 in) long in the centre of the labellum. Flowering occurs from August to September.

== Taxonomy and naming ==
Caladenia longicauda was first formally described by John Lindley in 1840 and the description was published in A Sketch of the Vegetation of the Swan River Colony. In 2001 Stephen Hopper and Andrew Brown described eleven subspecies, then in 2015 Brown and Garry Brockman described three more including subspecies insularis and the new descriptions were published in Nuytsia. The subspecies had previously been known as Caladenia longicauda subsp. 'Duke of Orleans Bay' and Hopper and Brown prepared an unpublished manuscript description of Caladenia longicauda subsp. insularis. The subspecies name (insularis) is a Latin word meaning “of islands" referring to the location of the type specimen.

== Distribution and habitat ==
The island white spider orchid is only known from a small area east of Esperance in the Esperance Plains biogeographic region where it grows in shallow soil in coastal heath on low granite outcrops.

== Conservation ==
Caladenia longicauda subsp. insularis is classified as "Priority One" by the Western Australian Government Department of Parks and Wildlife, meaning that it is known from only one or a few locations which are potentially at risk.
