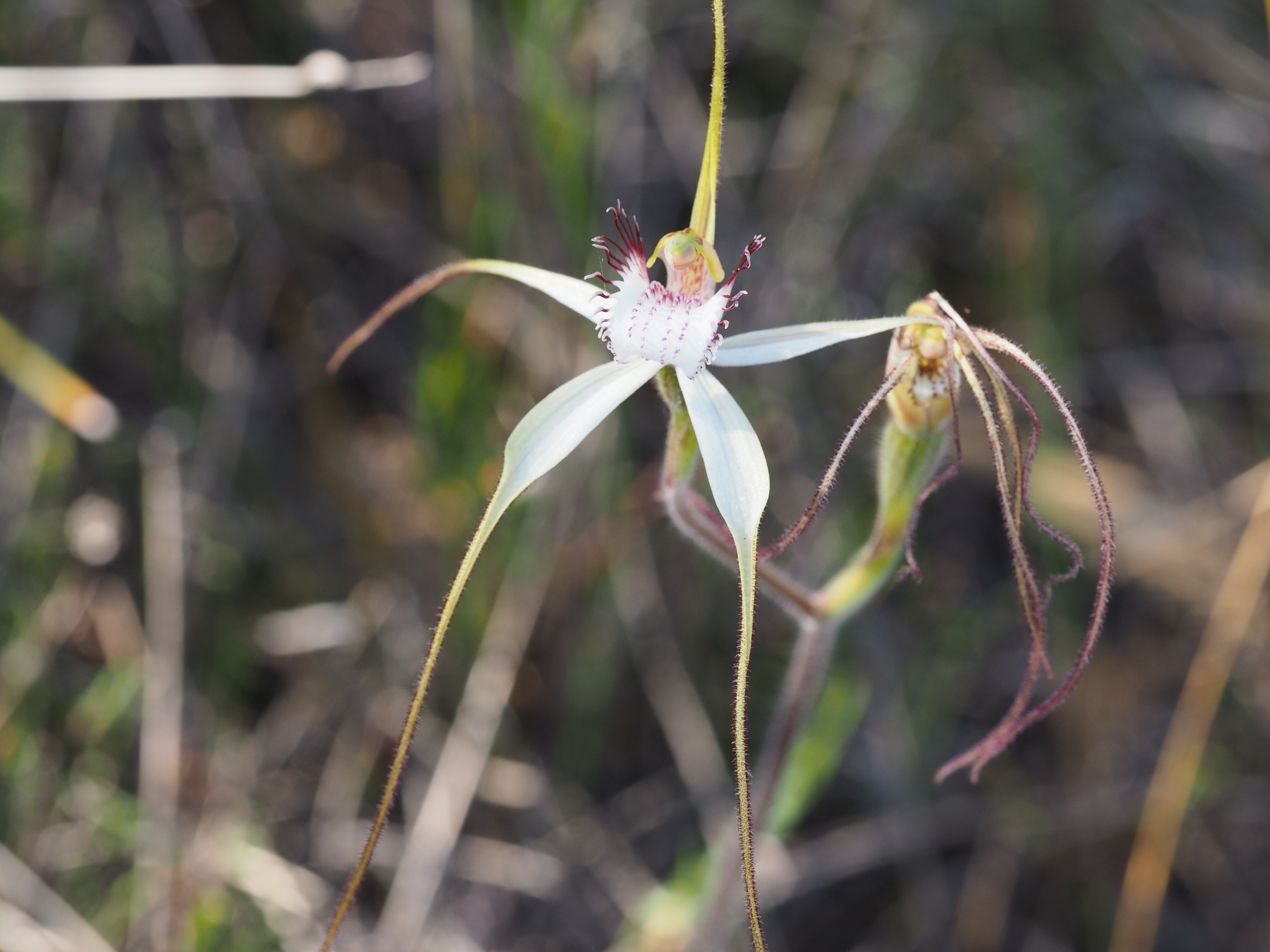
- Caladenia longicauda subsp. rigidula growing near Hopetoun

Scientific classification
- Kingdom: Plantae
- Clade: Tracheophytes
- Clade: Angiosperms
- Clade: Monocots
- Order: Asparagales
- Family: Orchidaceae
- Subfamily: Orchidoideae
- Tribe: Diurideae
- Genus: Caladenia
- Species: C. longicauda
- Subspecies: C. l. subsp. rigidula

Trinomial name
- Caladenia longicauda subsp. rigidula Hopper & A.P.Br.

Synonyms
- Arachnorchis longicauda subsp.rigidula (Hopper & A.P.Br.) D.L.Jones & M.A.Clem.

= Caladenia longicauda subsp. rigidula =

Rigid white spider orchid

Subspecies of orchid

Caladenia longicauda subsp. rigidula, commonly known as the rigid white spider orchid or island white spider orchid, is a plant in the orchid family Orchidaceae and is endemic to the south-west of Western Australia. It has a single hairy leaf and up to three large, mainly white flowers with relatively short lateral sepals and petals. It is similar to the reclining white spider orchid (C. cruscula) but that species has smaller, cream-coloured flowers.

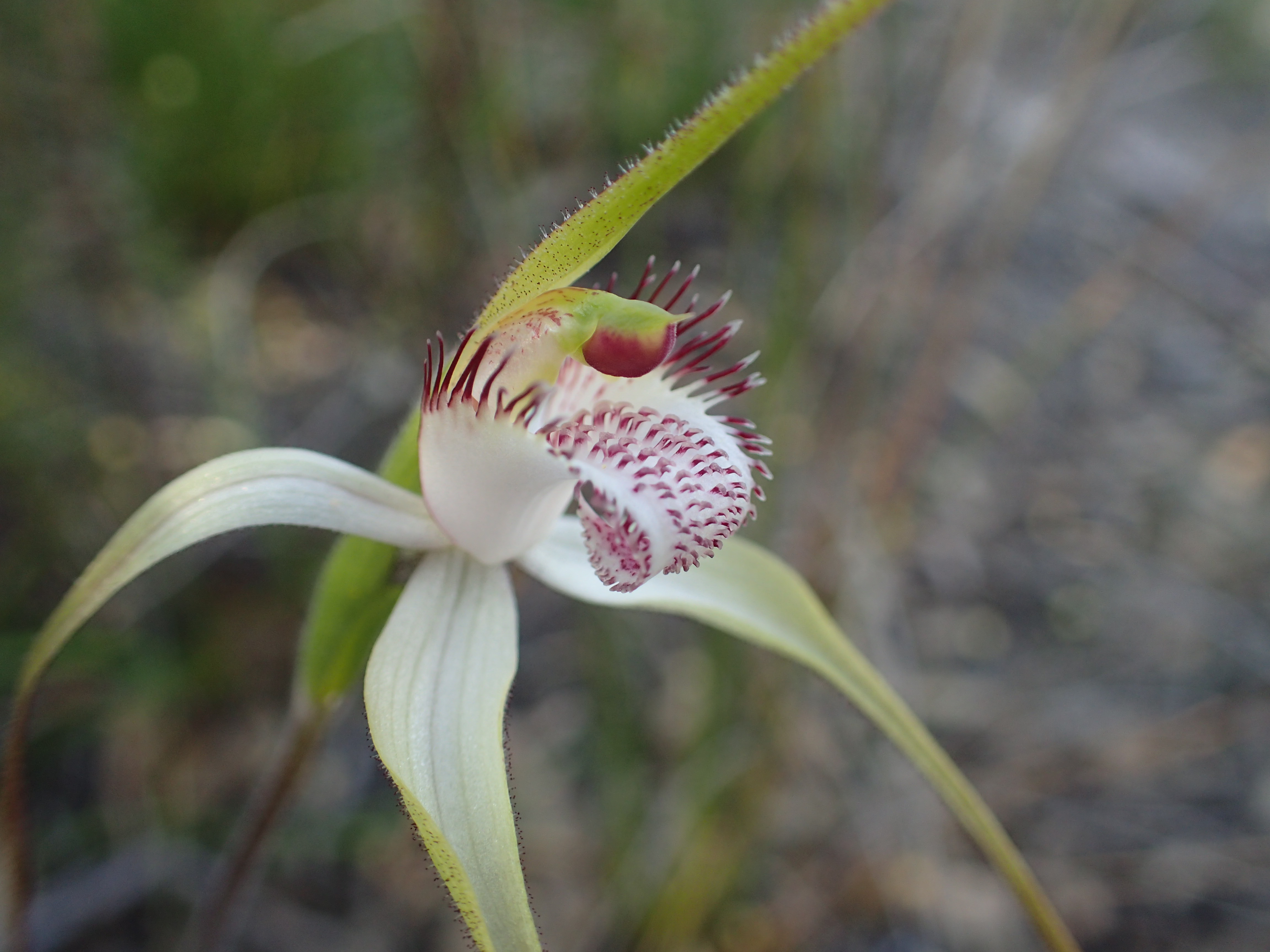
C. longicauda subsp. rigidula labellum detail

== Description ==
Caladenia longicauda subsp. rigidula is a terrestrial, perennial, deciduous, herb with an underground tuber and which usually grows as solitary plants. It has a single hairy leaf, 100–250 mm (4–10 in) long and 6–20 mm (0.2–0.8 in) wide. Up to three, mainly white flowers 70–120 mm (3–5 in) long and 60–100 mm (2–4 in) wide are borne on a spike 250–400 mm (10–20 in) tall. The dorsal sepal is erect, 34–500 mm (1–20 in) long and 2–3 mm (0.08–0.1 in) wide. The lateral sepals are 34–60 mm (1–2 in) long and 4–6 mm (0.16–0.24 in) wide, the petals are 28–50 mm (1–2 in) long and 2–4 mm (0.08–0.2 in) wide and all spread horizontally near their bases then turn slightly downwards. The labellum is white, 10–20 mm (0.4–0.8 in) long, 8–10 mm (0.3–0.4 in) wide with narrow teeth, up to 5 mm (0.2 in) long along its edges. There are usually two or four rows of pale red calli up to 1.5 mm (0.06 in) long in the centre of the labellum. Flowering occurs from August to early October. This subspecies is similar to Caladenia cruscula but has larger white flowers rather than creamy-yellow ones.

== Taxonomy and naming ==
Caladenia longicauda was first formally described by John Lindley in 1840 and the description was published in A Sketch of the Vegetation of the Swan River Colony. In 2001 Stephen Hopper and Andrew Brown described eleven subspecies, including subspecies rigidula and the descriptions were published in Nuytsia. The subspecies name (rigidula) is the diminutive form of the Latin word meaning "stiff", "hard" or "inflexible" hence "rather rigid", referring to the stiffly spreading sepals and petals of this subspecies.

== Distribution and habitat ==
The rigid white spider orchid mainly occurs between Ravensthorpe and Israelite Bay in the Coolgardie, Esperance Plains and Mallee biogeographic regions where it grows in moist places including in shallow soil on granite outcrops.

== Conservation ==
Caladenia longicauda subsp. rigidula is classified as "not threatened" by the Western Australian Government Department of Parks and Wildlife.
