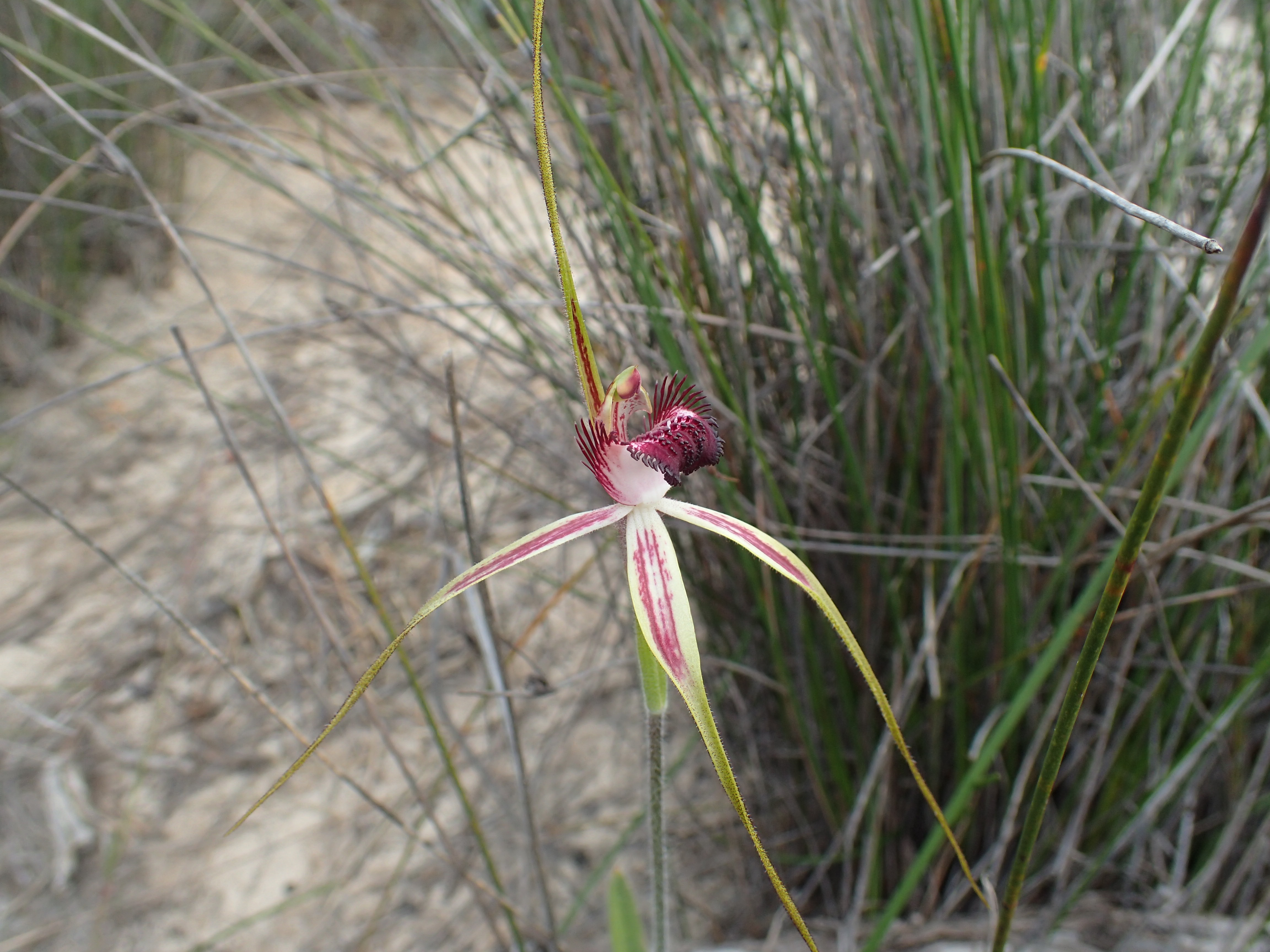
- Caladenia lorea growing near Eneabba

Scientific classification
- Kingdom: Plantae
- Clade: Tracheophytes
- Clade: Angiosperms
- Clade: Monocots
- Order: Asparagales
- Family: Orchidaceae
- Subfamily: Orchidoideae
- Tribe: Diurideae
- Genus: Caladenia
- Species: C. lorea

Binomial name
- Caladenia lorea Hopper & A.P.Br.

Synonyms
- Arachnorchis lorea (Hopper & A.P.Br.) D.L.Jones & M.A.Clem.; Calonemorchis lorea (Hopper & A.P.Br.) Szlach. & Rutk.

= Caladenia lorea =

Blushing spider orchid

Species of orchid

Caladenia lorea, commonly known as the blushing spider orchid, is a species of orchid endemic to the south-west of Western Australia. It has a single, hairy leaf and up to three cream, pink and red flowers and often hybridises with the white spider orchid (Caladenia longicauda) producing intermediate forms.

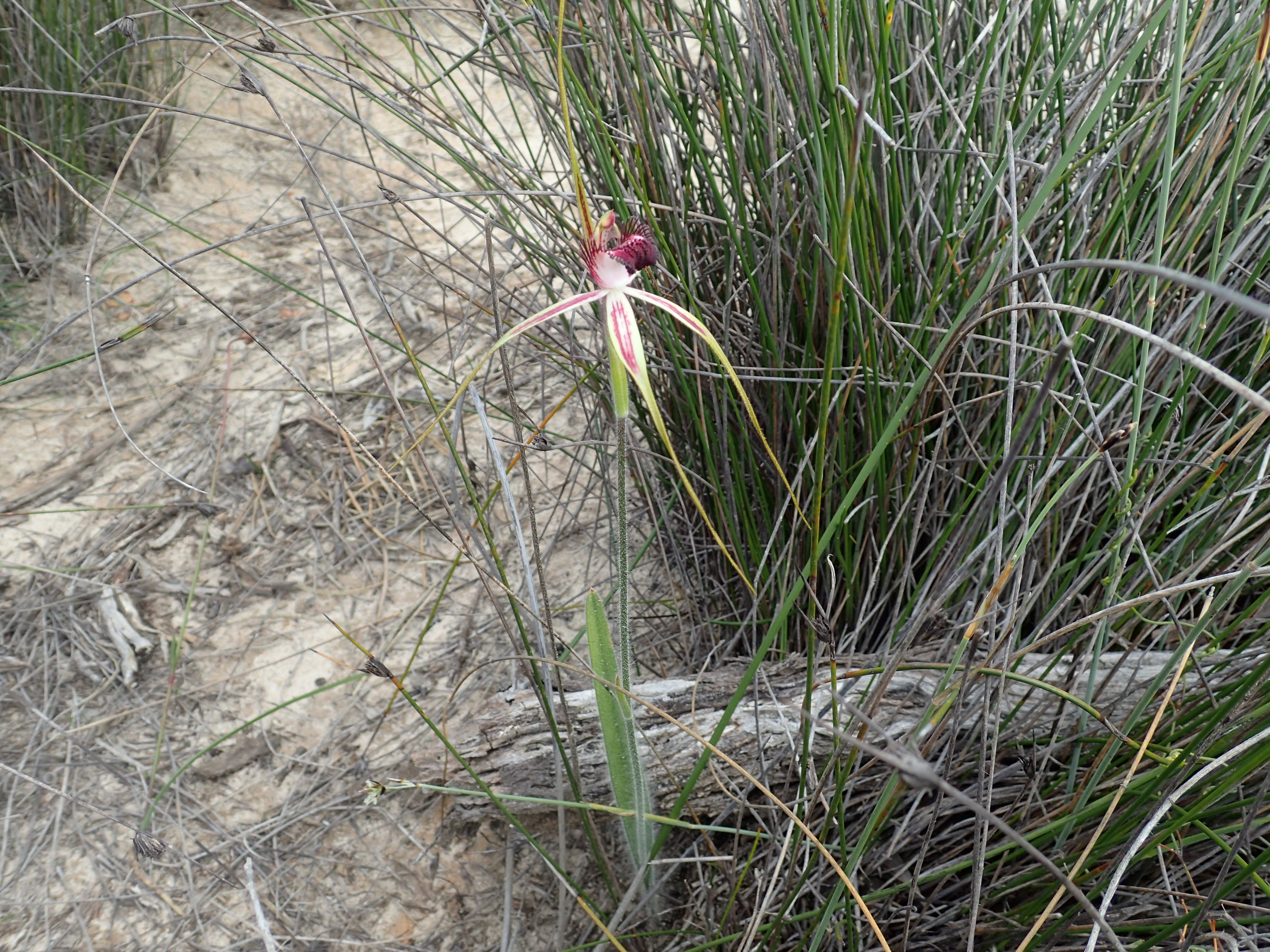
Caladenia lorea habit

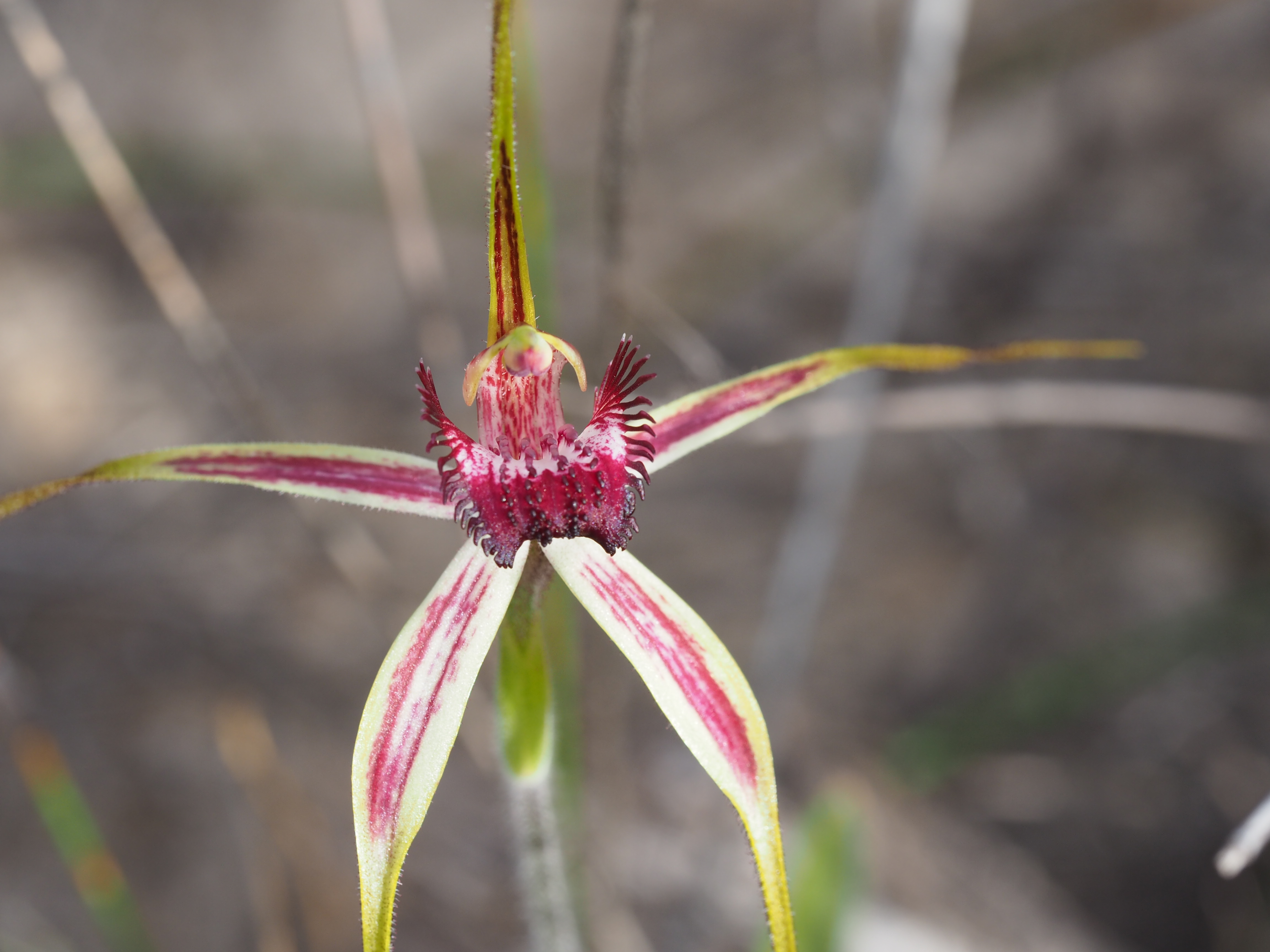
Caladenia lorea flower detail

== Description ==
Caladenia lorea is a terrestrial, perennial, deciduous, herb with an underground tuber and a single erect, hairy leaf, 120–200 mm (5–8 in) long and 7–10 mm (0.3–0.4 in) wide. Up to three cream, pink and red flowers, 100–160 mm (4–6 in) long and 70–120 mm (3–5 in) wide are borne on a stalk 250–400 mm (10–20 in) tall. The sepals and petals have thin, light brown, club-like glandular tips, 10–70 mm (0.4–3 in) long. The dorsal sepal is erect, 35–100 mm (1–4 in) long and 1.5–4 mm (0.06–0.2 in) wide and the lateral sepals are 35–100 mm (1–4 in) long and 3–7 mm (0.12–0.28 in) wide. The petals are 30–90 mm (1–4 in) long and 2–4 mm (0.08–0.2 in) wide. The lateral sepals and petals spread widely near their bases but turn downwards nearer their tips. The labellum is 17–27 mm (0.7–1 in) long and 10–15 mm (0.4–0.6 in) wide and pink with a dark red tip which curls under. The sides of the labellum have thin teeth up to 8 mm (0.3 in) long and there are four rows of dark red calli up to 2 mm (0.08 in) long in the centre. Flowering occurs from August to early October. This species often hybridises with Caladenia longicauda producing a range of intermediate forms.

== Taxonomy and naming ==
Caladenia lorea was first described in 2001 by Stephen Hopper and Andrew Phillip Brown from a specimen collected in Cockleshell Gully near Jurien Bay and the description was published in Nuytsia. The specific epithet (lorea) is derived from the Latin word lorum meaning "strap" or "thong" referring to the long "clubs" on the sepals and petals.

== Distribution and habitat ==
Blushing spider orchid occurs between Yanchep and Leeman with an isolated population south of Bunbury, in the Geraldton Sandplains, Jarrah Forest and Swan Coastal Plain biogeographic regions where it grows in areas that are wet in winter.

== Conservation ==
Caladenia lorea is classified as "not threatened" by the Western Australian Government Department of Parks and Wildlife.
