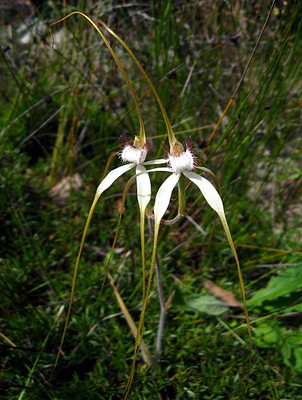
- In Perth

Scientific classification
- Kingdom: Plantae
- Clade: Embryophytes
- Clade: Tracheophytes
- Clade: Spermatophytes
- Clade: Angiosperms
- Clade: Monocots
- Order: Asparagales
- Family: Orchidaceae
- Subfamily: Orchidoideae
- Tribe: Diurideae
- Genus: Caladenia
- Species: C. longicauda
- Subspecies: C. l. subsp. calcigena

Trinomial name
- Caladenia longicauda subsp. calcigena Hopper & A.P.Br.

Synonyms
- Arachnorchis longicauda subsp. calcigena (Hopper & A.P.Br.) D.L.Jones & M.A.Clem.

= Caladenia longicauda subsp. calcigena =

Coastal white spider orchid

Subspecies of orchid

Caladenia longicauda subsp. calcigena, commonly known as the coastal white spider orchid, is a plant in the orchid family Orchidaceae and is endemic to the south-west of Western Australia. It has a single hairy leaf and up to four mostly white flowers. It grows in coastal sand on the west coast and is distinguished from other subspecies growing in the same area, by its longer sepals and petals, small, narrow labellum and by the arrangement of the calli on its labellum.

== Description ==
Caladenia longicauda subsp. calcigena is a terrestrial, perennial, deciduous, herb with an underground tuber and a single hairy leaf, 80–120 mm (3–5 in) long and 8–12 mm (0.3–0.5 in) wide. Up to four mostly white flowers 100–150 mm (4–6 in) long and 30–80 mm (1–3 in) wide are borne on a spike 250–400 mm (10–20 in) tall. The lateral sepals and petals have long drooping tips. The dorsal sepal is erect and the labellum is mostly white, 16–22 mm (0.6–0.9 in) long and 7–10 mm (0.3–0.4 in) with long, narrow teeth on its sides. There are four or more rows of pale red calli in its centre but which become crowded and irregularly arranged near the tip. Flowering occurs from September to October.

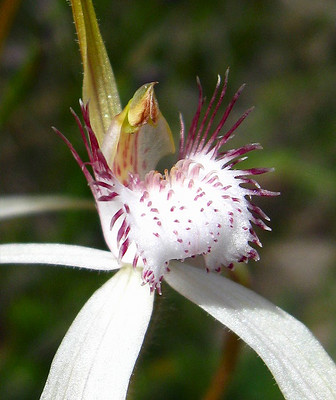
labellum detail

== Taxonomy and naming ==
Caladenia longicauda was first formally described by John Lindley in 1840 and the description was published in A Sketch of the Vegetation of the Swan River Colony. In 2001 Stephen Hopper and Andrew Brown described eleven subspecies, including subspecies calcigena and the descriptions were published in Nuytsia. The subspecies name (calcigena) is derived from the Latin calx, calcis meaning "lime" and -genus meaning "born or produced in a certain situation", referring to the limestone soils in which this orchid grows.

== Distribution and habitat ==
The coastal white spider orchid occurs in the area between Bunbury and Cliff Head near Dongara, in the Jarrah Forest and Swan Coastal Plain biogeographic regions where it grows in woodland and heath in sand over limestone.

== Conservation ==
Caladenia longicauda subsp. calcigena is classified as "not threatened" by the Western Australian Government Department of Parks and Wildlife.
