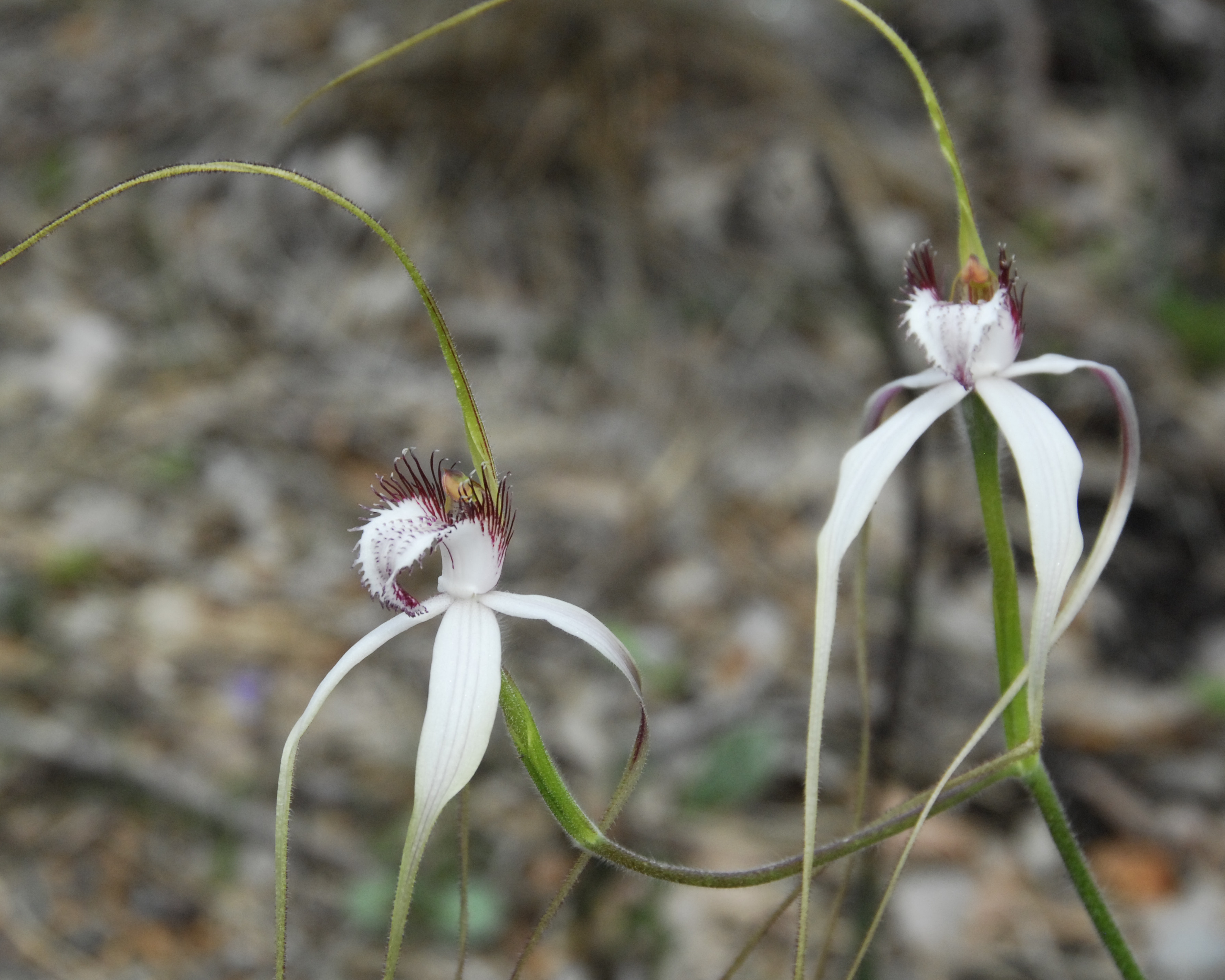
- Caladenia longicauda in John Forrest National Park

Scientific classification
- Kingdom: Plantae
- Clade: Embryophytes
- Clade: Tracheophytes
- Clade: Spermatophytes
- Clade: Angiosperms
- Clade: Monocots
- Order: Asparagales
- Family: Orchidaceae
- Subfamily: Orchidoideae
- Tribe: Diurideae
- Genus: Caladenia
- Species: C. longicauda

Binomial name
- Caladenia longicauda Lindl.

Synonyms
- List: Arachnorchis longicauda (Lindl.) D.L.Jones & M.A.Clem.; Caladenia longicauda Lindl. var. longicauda; Calonema longicauda Szlach. orth. var.; Calonema longicaudum (Lindl.) Szlach.; Caladenia patersonii auct. non R.Br.: Green, J.W. (1981)

= Caladenia longicauda =

Species of orchid

Caladenia longicauda is a species of plant in the orchid family Orchidaceae and is endemic to the south-west of Western Australia. It is distinguished by its large leaf and by its up to five large, white flowers which have drooping sepals and petals with long, thickish brown "tails".

== Description ==
Caladenia longicauda is a terrestrial, perennial, deciduous, herb with an underground tuber and a single hairy leaf, 100–250 mm (4–10 in) long and 5–20 mm (0.2–0.8 in) wide. Between July and early November it produces one to three (sometimes up to five) flowers on a stalk 170–600 mm (7–20 in) tall, each flower 50–180 mm (2–7 in) wide. The flowers are mostly white except for a few red markings and reddish stripes on the backs of the petals and sepals. The dorsal sepal is green, erect, 30–140 mm (1–6 in) long and 1.5–6 mm (0.06–0.2 in) wide with its edges slightly turned inwards. The lateral sepals are 30–150 mm (1–6 in) long, 2–10 mm (0.08–0.4 in) wide, spreading horizontally near their bases but then drooping. The petals are similar to the sepals but slightly shorter and narrower. The labellum is white, 7–28 mm (0.3–1 in) long, 6–18 mm (0.2–0.7 in) wide with erect to spreading teeth up to 10 mm (0.4 in) long along its sides. The middle part of the labellum has the longest teeth on its edge. These teeth are red with hooked white tips. The front part of the labellum curves downwards, with the teeth becoming shorter. There are between four and eight rows of calli along the central part of the labellum, the calli pale to dark red and club-shaped. The fruit is a non-fleshy, dehiscent capsule containing a large number of seeds.

== Taxonomy and naming ==
Caladenia longicauda was first formally described by John Lindley in 1840 and the description was published in A Sketch of the Vegetation of the Swan River Colony. The specific epithet (longicauda) is derived from the Latin words longus meaning "long" and cauda meaning "tail".

The names of fourteen subspecies of C. longicauda are accepted by the Australian Plant Census:

Subspecies	Description	Distribution and habitat	Image
C. longicauda Lindl. subsp. longicauda	Lateral sepals 90–130 mm (3.5–5.1 in) long, labellum 10–15 mm (0.39–0.59 in) wide	Woodland between Lancelin and Nannup	
C. longicauda subsp. albella Hopper & A.P.Br. (small-lipped spider orchid)	Lateral sepals 60–110 mm (2.4–4.3 in) long, labellum 6–8 mm (0.24–0.31 in) wide	Swampy areas between Eneabba and Gingin	
C. longicauda subsp. australora Hopper & A.P.Br. (southern white spider orchid)	Lateral sepals 70–90 mm (2.8–3.5 in) long, labellum 10–13 mm (0.39–0.51 in) wide	Coastal areas between the Fitzgerald River National Park and Beaufort Inlet	
C. longicauda subsp. borealis Hopper & A.P.Br. (daddy-long-legs spider orchid	Lateral sepals 70–100 mm (2.8–3.9 in) long, labellum 7–10 mm (0.28–0.39 in) wide	Shrubland between Cataby and Kalbarri	
C. longicauda subsp. calcigena Hopper & A.P.Br. (Coastal white spider orchid)	Lateral sepals 70–140 mm (2.8–5.5 in) long, labellum 7–10 mm (0.28–0.39 in) wide	Near-coastal areas between Bunbury and Dongara	
C. longicauda subsp. clivicola Hopper & A.P.Br. (Hill's white spider orchid)	Lateral sepals 90–140 mm (3.5–5.5 in) long, labellum 7–10 mm (0.28–0.39 in) wide	Forests between North Dandalup and Collie and coastal heath near Dunsborough	
C. longicauda subsp. crassa Hopper & A.P.Br. (Esperance white spider orchid)	Lateral sepals 70–100 mm (2.8–3.9 in) long, labellum 12–18 mm (0.47–0.71 in) wide	Swampy places between Esperance and Israelite Bay	
C. longicauda subsp. eminens (Domin) Hopper & A.P.Br. (stark white spider orchid)	Lateral sepals 90–140 mm (3.5–5.5 in) long, labellum 10–15 mm (0.39–0.59 in) wide	Widespread between Moore and Ravensthorpe	
C. longicauda subsp. extrema A.P.Br. & G.Brockman	Lateral sepals 60–95 mm (2.4–3.7 in) long, labellum 5–12 mm (0.20–0.47 in) wide	Winter-wet areas near Manjimup	
C. longicauda subsp. insularis Hopper & A.P.Br. ex A.P.Br. & G.Brockman	Lateral sepals 40–60 mm (1.6–2.4 in) long, labellum 5–7 mm (0.20–0.28 in) wide	Coastal heath near Esperance	
C. longicauda subsp. merrittii Hopper & A.P.Br. (Merritt's white spider orchid)	Lateral sepals 110–170 mm (4.3–6.7 in) long, labellum 9–11 mm (0.35–0.43 in) wide	Forest between Margaret River and Nannup	
C. longicauda subsp. minima A.P.Br. & G.Brockman	Lateral sepals 60–80 mm (2.4–3.1 in) long, labellum 6–8 mm (0.24–0.31 in) wide	Woodland or shrubland near Yuna	
Caladenia longicauda subsp. redacta Hopper & A.P.Br. (tangled spider orchid)	Lateral sepals 60–90 mm (2.4–3.5 in) long, labellum 7–10 mm (0.28–0.39 in) wide	Woodland between Collie and Mount Barker	
C. longicauda subsp. rigidula Hopper & A.P.Br. (rigid spider orchid)	Lateral sepals 40–60 mm (1.6–2.4 in) long, labellum 8–10 mm (0.31–0.39 in) wide	On granite outcrops or near streams between Ravensthorpe and Balladonia	

== Distribution and habitat ==
Caladenia longicauda grows in a wide range of habitats from the Kalbarri National Park on the west coast to Israelite Bay on the south coast.

== Conservation ==
Most subspecies of C. longicauda are classified as "Not Threatened" but subspecies extrema and insularis are classified as "Priority One" by the Western Australian Government Department of Parks and Wildlife meaning that they are known from only one or a few locations which are potentially at risk. Subspecies minima is classified as "Priority Two", meaning that it is poorly known and from only one or a few locations.
