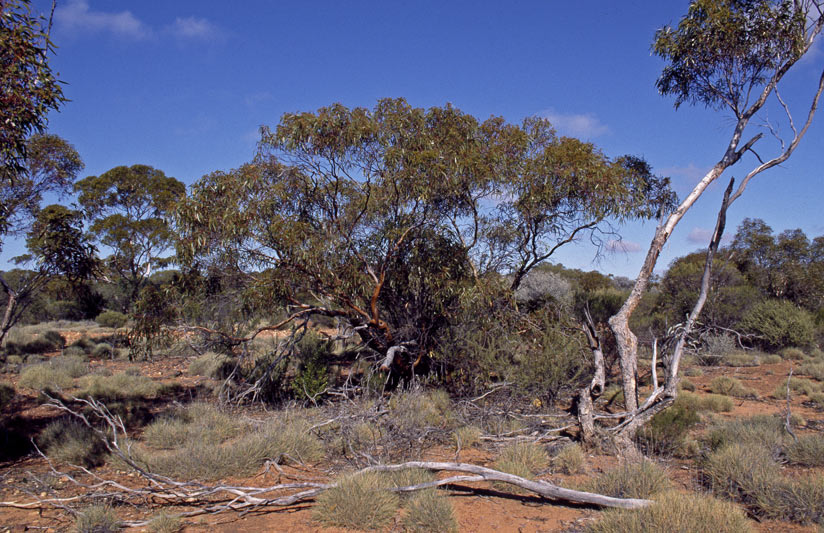
- Eucalyptus articulata near Lake Minigwal in the Great Victoria Desert

Conservation status
- Vulnerable (IUCN 3.1)

Scientific classification
- Kingdom: Plantae
- Clade: Tracheophytes
- Clade: Angiosperms
- Clade: Eudicots
- Clade: Rosids
- Order: Myrtales
- Family: Myrtaceae
- Genus: Eucalyptus
- Species: E. articulata

Binomial name
- Eucalyptus articulata Brooker & Hopper

= Eucalyptus articulata =

Ponton Creek mallee

Species of eucalyptus

Eucalyptus articulata, also known as the Ponton Creek mallee, is a low, straggly mallee that is endemic to a small area near Kalgoorlie in the Goldfields-Esperance region of Western Australia. It has smooth bark, lance-shaped leaves, flower buds in groups of seven, white flowers and conical fruit.

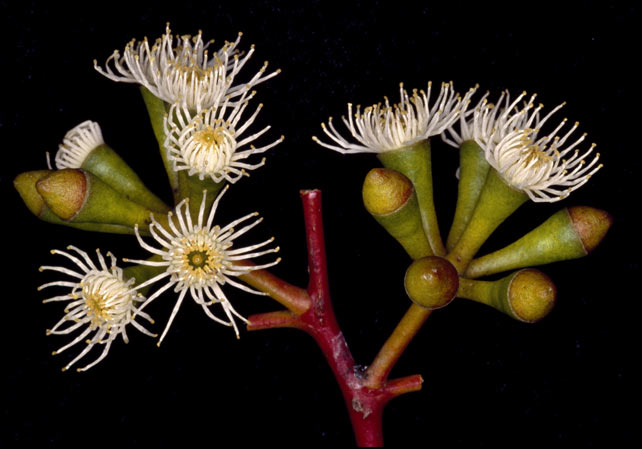
Flowers

== Description ==
Eucalyptus articulata is a low straggly mallee that typically grows to a height of 3 metres (10 ft) and has smooth bark that is a light coppery color over the length of the trunk and branches. Leaves on young plants and coppice regrowth are similar to adult leaves but dull bluish green. The adult leaves are dark glossy green on both sides, lance-shaped, 60–120 mm (2–5 in) long, 10–15 mm (0.4–0.6 in) wide on a petiole 8–18 mm (0.3–0.7 in) long. The leaves have many large oil glands. The flower buds are arranged in group of seven in leaf axils, sometimes appearing to be in clusters on the ends of the branches. Mature buds are oval to pear-shaped, 7–9 mm (0.3–0.4 in) long, 3–5 mm (0.1–0.2 in) wide with a conical operculum. The groups are on a flattened peduncle 5–15 mm (0.2–0.6 in) long, the individual flowers on a pedicel 4–6 mm (0.16–0.24 in) long. Flowering occurs between July and August and the flowers are white. The fruit is a woody, conical capsule 7–9 mm (0.28–0.35 in) long, 4–7 mm (0.2–0.3 in) wide. The seeds produced are red-brown with an ovoid to flattened-ovoid or cuboid shape with a length of 0.7 to 1.5 mm (0.03 to 0.06 in).

== Taxonomy and naming ==
Eucalyptus articulata was first formally described in 1993 by Stephen Hopper and Ian Brooker from a specimen they collected in 1987 east of Mulga Rock in the Great Victoria Desert. The description was published in the journal Nuytsia. The specific epithet (articulata) is a Latin word meaning "jointed" or "distinct", referring to the base of the style.

== Distribution and habitat ==
Ponton Creek mallee grows in red sandy dunes, arkose rubble and sandy loam. There are three known remaining populations spread over a distance of 1.5 to 2 kilometres (0.9 to 1.2 mi) with a total population of around 120 plants, all on unallocated Crown land in the Mulga area of the Great Victoria Desert biogeographic region.

== Conservation ==
In 2008 E. articulata was listed as vulnerable under the Environment Protection and Biodiversity Conservation Act 1999. It has also been classified as "Threatened Flora (Declared Rare Flora — Extant)" by the Department of Environment and Conservation (Western Australia). The main threat to the species is inappropriate fire regimes but it is not known whether or not the species is fire-tolerant.

== See also ==
- List of Eucalyptus species
