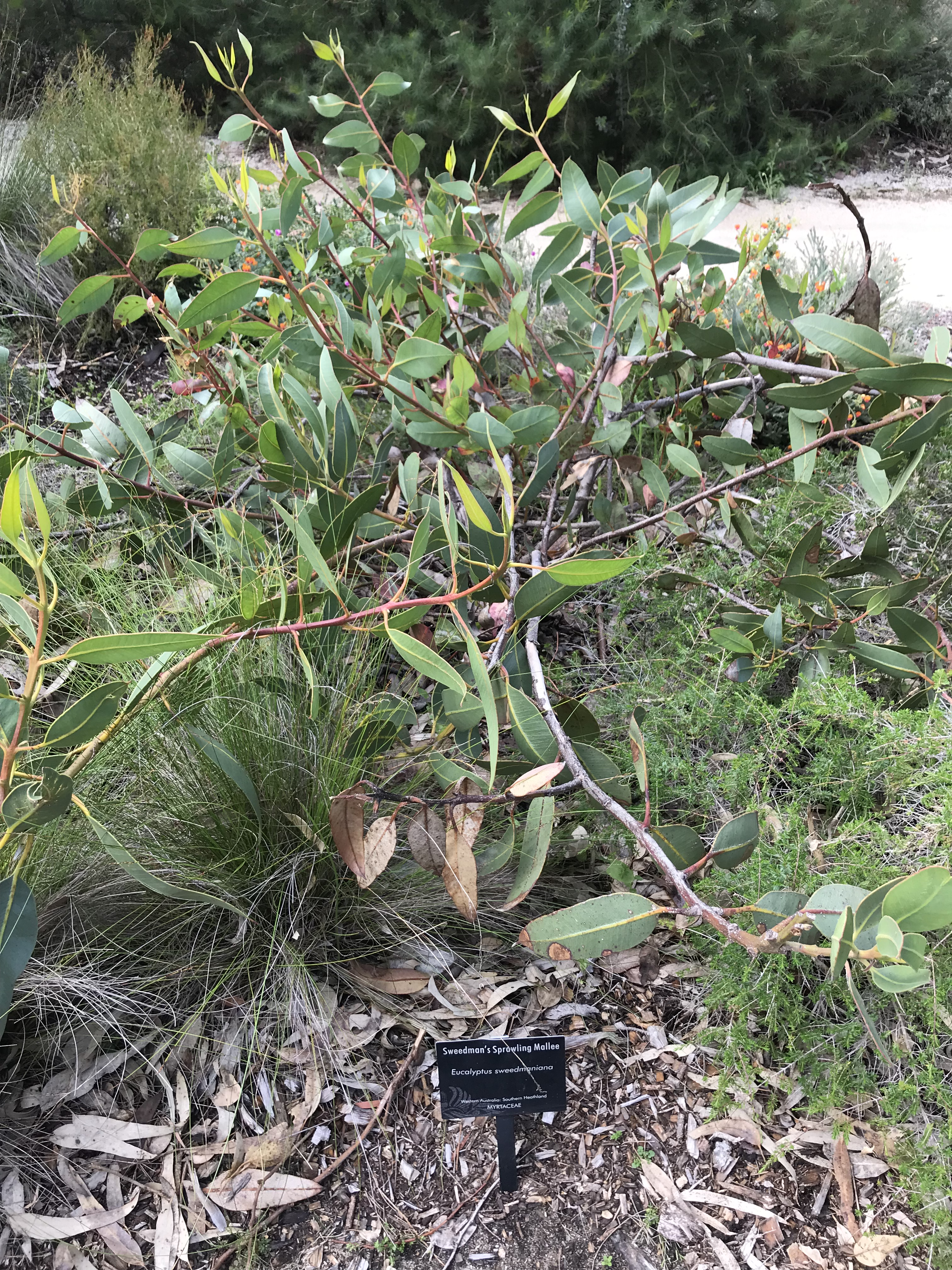
- Eucalyptus sweedmaniana at Kings Park

Conservation status
- Priority Two — Poorly Known Taxa (DEC)

Scientific classification
- Kingdom: Plantae
- Clade: Tracheophytes
- Clade: Angiosperms
- Clade: Eudicots
- Clade: Rosids
- Order: Myrtales
- Family: Myrtaceae
- Genus: Eucalyptus
- Species: E. sweedmaniana

Binomial name
- Eucalyptus sweedmaniana Hopper & McQuoid

= Eucalyptus sweedmaniana =

Sweedman's sprawling mallee

Species of eucalyptus

Eucalyptus sweedmaniana is a sprawling to prostrate mallee that is endemic to a small area in the Cape Arid National Park in Western Australia. It has smooth, silvery grey bark, broadly lance-shaped, glossy green adult leaves, single red, pendulous flower buds in leaf axils, pink flowers and prominently winged fruit.

== Description ==
Eucalyptus sweedmaniana is a sprawling or prostrate mallee that grows to a height of about 1 m (3 ft 3 in), a width of 5 m (16 ft) and forms a lignotuber. It has smooth, shiny silvery grey bark that fades to dull grey. Young plants have reddish green, lance-shaped to elliptical leaves that are 42–63 mm (1.7–2.5 in) long and 19–25 mm (0.75–0.98 in) wide on a petiole 8–15 mm (0.31–0.59 in) long. Adult leaves are the same shade of glossy green on both sides, broadly lance-shaped, 165–263 mm (6.5–10.4 in) long and 45–67 mm (1.8–2.6 in) wide on thick, flattened petiole 38–48 mm (1.5–1.9 in) long. The flower buds are arranged singly in leaf axils on a down-curved, winged peduncle. The mature flower buds are red, square in cross section with prominent wings, with a red, pyramid-shaped operculum. Flowering has been observed from November to February and the flowers are pink. The fruit is a woody, cube-shaped to oblong capsule that is square in cross-section, 34–38 mm (1.3–1.5 in) long and 30–41 mm (1.2–1.6 in) wide with prominent wings and the valves enclosed below the rim.

== Taxonomy ==
Eucalyptus sweedmaniana was first formally described in 2009 by Stephen Hopper and Nathan K. McQuoid and the description was published in Australian Systematic Botany from a specimen in the Cape Arid National Park in 2006. The specific epithet (sweedmaniana) honours Luke Sweedman, a former curator of the Western Australian Seed Technology Centre, Western Australian Botanic Garden, Kings Park and Botanic Garden.

== Distribution ==
This mallee is only known from the lower coastal slopes of Mount Arid where it is exposed to significant salt spray.

== Conservation ==
Eucalyptus sweedmaniana is classified as "Priority Two" by the Western Australian Government Department of Parks and Wildlife meaning that it is poorly known and from only one or a few locations.

== See also ==
- List of Eucalyptus species
