= Eucalyptus famelica =

Conservation status
- Data Deficient (IUCN 3.1)

- Priority Three — Poorly Known Taxa (DEC)

Scientific classification
- Kingdom: Plantae
- Clade: Tracheophytes
- Clade: Angiosperms
- Clade: Eudicots
- Clade: Rosids
- Order: Myrtales
- Family: Myrtaceae
- Genus: Eucalyptus
- Species: E. famelica

Binomial name
- Eucalyptus famelica Brooker & Hopper

Species of eucalyptus

Eucalyptus famelica is a species of mallee that is endemic to Western Australia. It has smooth grey and pale brown bark, sometimes with thin, rough, fibrous bark near the base of the trunk on larger plants. The adult leaves are lance-shaped, the flower buds are arranged in groups of seven, the flowers are creamy white and the fruit is cup-shaped to cylindrical.

== Description ==
Eucalyptus famelica is a mallee that typically grows to a height of 1.5–4 m (4 ft 11 in – 13 ft 1 in), has a dense crown that often extends to ground level and forms a lignotuber. It has smooth, grey and pale pinkish brown bark, sometimes with thin, rough fibrous bark on the lower trunk of larger specimens. Young plants and coppice regrowth have stems that are more or less square in cross-section and elliptical to egg-shaped leaves that are 45–75 mm (1.8–3.0 in) long and 15–30 mm (0.59–1.18 in) wide. Adult leaves are lance-shaped, the same glossy green on both sides, 45–110 mm (1.8–4.3 in) long and 9–23 mm (0.35–0.91 in) wide on a petiole 10–25 mm (0.39–0.98 in) long. The flower buds are arranged in leaf axils in groups of seven on a flattened, unbranched peduncle 6–13 mm (0.24–0.51 in) long, the individual buds sessile or on pedicels up to 4 mm (0.16 in) long. Mature buds are more or less cylindrical to spindle-shaped, 9–17 mm (0.35–0.67 in) long and 4–7 mm (0.16–0.28 in) wide with conical operculum. Flowering occurs between April and July and the flowers are creamy white. The fruit is a woody, cup-shaped to cylindrical capsule, 8–12 mm (0.31–0.47 in) long and 7–10 mm (0.28–0.39 in) wide with the valves below rim level.

== Taxonomy and naming ==
Eucalyptus famelica was first formally described in 1989 by Ian Brooker and Stephen Hopper from a specimen Brooker collected near Starvation Boat Harbour, and the description was published in the journal Nuytsia. The specific epithet (famelica) is derived from a Latin word meaning "hungry", an oblique reference to the type location.

== Distribution and habitat ==
This mallee mainly grows in winter-wet sites in undulating sandplain and is only known from a few locations between Ravensthorpe and Esperance.

== Conservation status ==
Eucalyptus famelica is classified as "Priority Three" by the Government of Western Australia Department of Parks and Wildlife meaning that it is poorly known and known from only a few locations but is not under imminent threat.

== See also ==
- List of Eucalyptus species
