= A Sketch of the Vegetation of the Swan River Colony =

Book by John Lindley

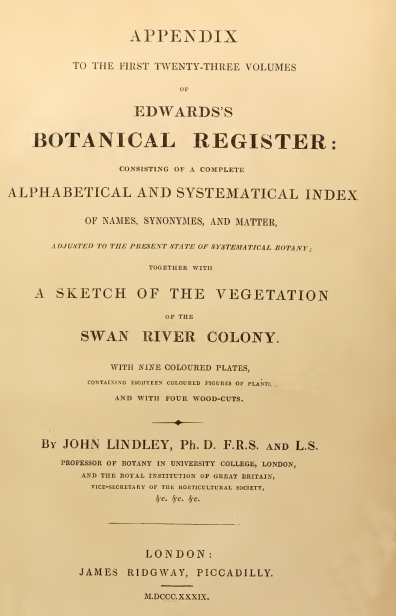
Frontispiece to the publication in which A Sketch of the Vegetation of the Swan River Colony appeared

"A Sketch of the Vegetation of the Swan River Colony", also known by its standard botanical abbreviation Sketch Veg. Swan R., is an 1839 article by John Lindley on the flora of the Swan River Colony. Nearly 300 new species were published in it, many of which are still current.

It appeared as Part Three of Appendix to the first twenty three volumes of Edward's Botanical Register, the first two parts being indices of previous volumes of Edwards's Botanical Register, of which Lindley was editor. It contained 58 pages, issued in three parts. Pages 1 to 16 were issued on 1 November 1839; pages 17 to 32 on 1 December 1839; and the remaining 26 pages on 1 January 1840. It also contained four woodcuts based on sketches by Lindley, and nine hand-coloured lithographic plates, the artist and lithographer of which are unacknowledged and are now unknown. According to Helen Hewson, the woodcuts are of high quality, but the plates "do not measure up to the standard of contemporary illustration".

"A Sketch of the Vegetation of the Swan River Colony" represents only the second attempt to provide a flora for the colony, the first being Stephan Endlicher's 1837 Enumeratio plantarum, a Latin work of which only one installment was published. Thus there were at the time a great many undescribed species awaiting publication — speaking of the (now defunct) order Stylidaceae, Lindley remarks "In Brown's prodromus forty-six species only are named for all New Holland... but I possess from Swan River alone at least forty well marked species, and there are some of Baron Hugel's with which I am unacquainted". Working primarily from the collections of James Drummond, Lindley was able to publish around 280 new taxa, many of which remain current.
