= Andrew Phillip Brown =

Australian botanist

Andrew Phillip Brown (born 1951) is a conservation biologist and taxonomist at the Western Australian Department of Environment and Conservation. He is also curator of Orchidaceae and Myoporaceae at the Western Australian Herbarium and is a founding member of the Australian Orchid Foundation as well as the Western Australia Native Orchid Study and Conservation Group. Brown has authored more than 100 journal articles and seven books on the flora of Western Australia, including a comprehensive field guide to the eremophilas of that region.

The standard author abbreviation A.P.Br. is used to indicate this person as the author when citing a botanical name.
