= Stephen Hopper =

Australian botanist

Stephen Donald Hopper AC FTSE
- Born: 18 June 1951 (age 74)
- Known for: OCBIL Theory (old, climatically-buffered, infertile landscapes)
- Scientific career
- Fields: Botany, Conservation Biology, Eucalyptus, Haemodoraceae
- Institutions: University of Western Australia, Kings Park, Royal Botanic Gardens, Kew
- Thesis: Speciation in the Kangaroo Paws of South-western Australia: (Anigozanthos and Macropidia: Haemodoraceae).
- Author abbrev. (botany): Hopper

Stephen Donald Hopper (born 18 June 1951) is a Western Australian botanist. He graduated in biology, specialising in conservation biology and vascular plants. Hopper has written eight books, and has over 200 publications to his name. He was Director of Kings Park in Perth for seven years, and CEO of the Botanic Gardens and Parks Authority for five. He is currently Foundation Professor of Plant Conservation Biology at The University of Western Australia. He was director of the Royal Botanic Gardens, Kew from 2006 to 2012.

This botanist is denoted by the author abbreviation Hopper when citing a botanical name.

== Research ==
Hopper published his early research on the systematics and speciation of the family Haemodoraceae, including kangaroo paws (Anigozanthos), which formed the basis of his PhD at the University of Western Australia in 1978. He subsequently worked on the conservation, ecology, and taxonomy of Western Australian flora, including eucalypts, orchids, and plants of granite outcrops.

In the 1990s and 2000s, Hopper's research extended to plant biogeography and conservation management, emphasising the flora of south-western Australia. In 2009 he developed the OCBIL theory (old, climatically buffered, infertile landscapes), proposing evolutionary and ecological processes distinctive to ancient, nutrient-poor regions.

== Honours ==
On 1 January 2001, the Australian government awarded Hopper the Centenary Medal for his "service to the community". On 11 June 2012, Hopper was named a Companion of the Order of Australia for "eminent service as a global science leader in the field of plant conservation biology, particularly in the delivery of world class research programs contributing to the conservation of endangered species and ecosystems." He was also inducted into the Western Australia Science Hall of Fame in the same year.

== Albany ==
In 2015, he moved to Albany, Western Australia, and he has returned to his interest in Anigozanthus. In 2025 he published a book on the genus Eucalyptus that examines Aboriginal knowledge and Western Science relating to the genus.

== Selected works ==
- Gondwanan heritage (1996)
- Eucalyptus (2025)

with Jane Sampson:

- Endangered poison plants (1989)

with Anne Taylor:

- The Banksia Atlas (1991)

with Bert and Babs Wells:

- Kangaroo paws and catspaws (1993)

with illustrator Philippa Nikulinsky:

- Soul of the Desert (2005)
- Life on the Rocks (2008)
