= Caladenia javanica =

Scientific classification
- Kingdom: Plantae
- Clade: Tracheophytes
- Clade: Angiosperms
- Clade: Monocots
- Order: Asparagales
- Family: Orchidaceae
- Subfamily: Orchidoideae
- Tribe: Diurideae
- Genus: Caladenia
- Species: C. javanica

Binomial name
- Caladenia javanica Benn. ex Ridl.

Synonyms
- Petalochilus javanicus (Benn. ex Ridl.) D.L.Jones & M.A.Clem.

Species of orchid

Caladenia javanica is a species of plant in the orchid family, Orchidaceae and is endemic to Indonesia. It has a single linear leaf and an erect, hairy stem with one or two flowers. The sepals and petals are lance-shaped to oblong and the labellum has purple lines and yellow calli. This orchid grows on grassy, rocky slopes. It was first formally described by Henry Ridley from an unpublished manuscript by John Bennett and the description was published in Henry Forbes's book, A Naturalist's Wanderings in the Eastern Archipelago. Plants of the World Online lists Caladenia javanica as a synonym of Caladenia catenata.
