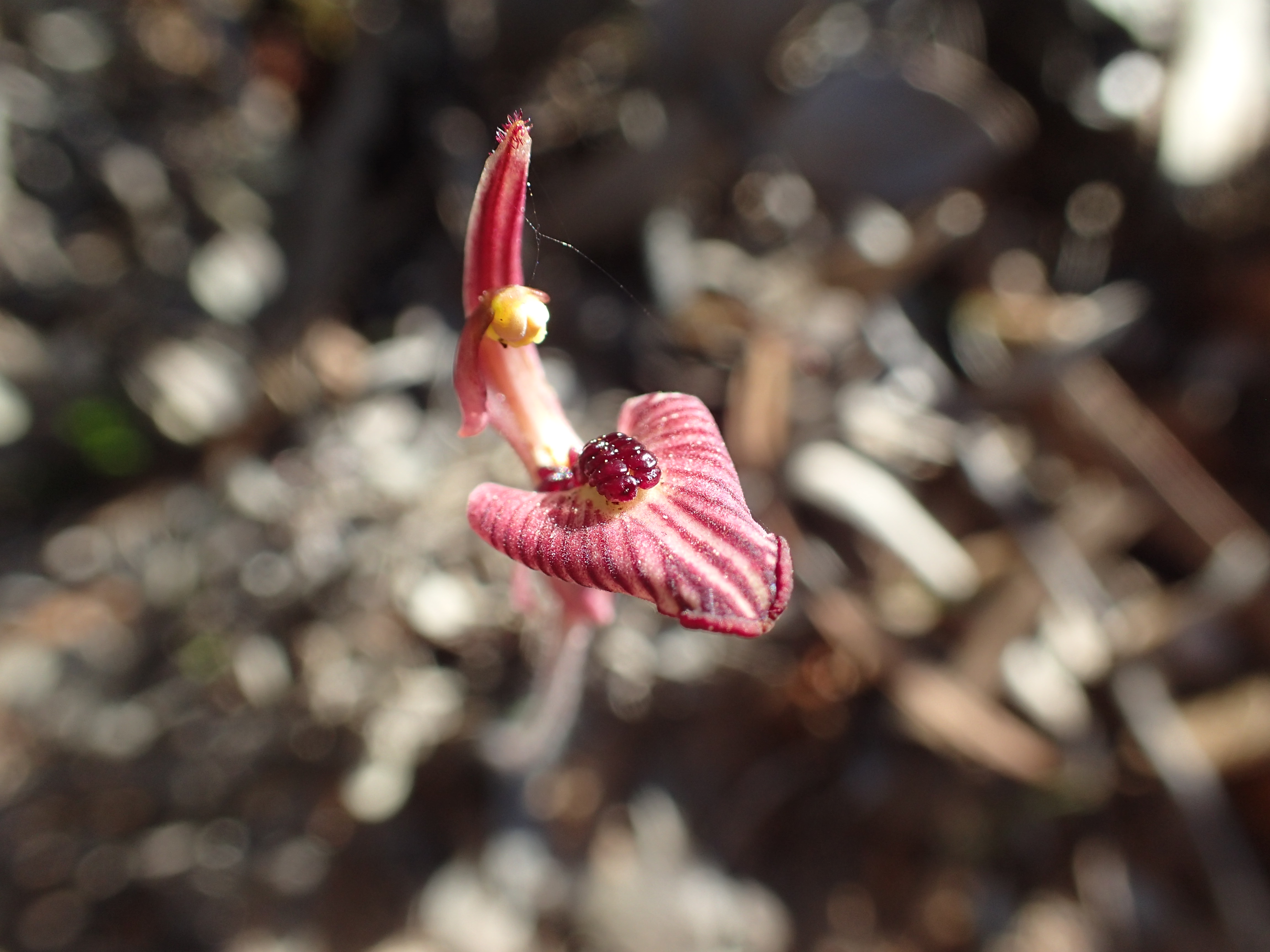
- Near Esperance airport

Scientific classification
- Kingdom: Plantae
- Clade: Embryophytes
- Clade: Tracheophytes
- Clade: Spermatophytes
- Clade: Angiosperms
- Clade: Monocots
- Order: Asparagales
- Family: Orchidaceae
- Subfamily: Orchidoideae
- Tribe: Diurideae
- Genus: Caladenia
- Species: C. pachychila

Binomial name
- Caladenia pachychila Hopper & A.P.Br.

Synonyms
- Calonemorchis pachychila (Hopper & A.P.Br.) D.L.Jones & M.A.Clem.; Calonema pachychilum chila (Hopper & A.P.Br.) D.L.Jones & M.A.Clem.; Jonesiopsis pachychila (Hopper & A.P.Br.) D.L.Jones & M.A.Clem.; Phlebochilus pachychila (Hopper & A.P.Br.) Szlach. & Rutk.

= Caladenia pachychila =

Dwarf zebra orchid

Species of orchid

Caladenia pachychila, commonly known as the dwarf zebra orchid, is a species of orchid endemic to the south-west of Western Australia. It has a single erect, hairy leaf and one or two greenish-yellow and red flowers with a red-striped labellum which has a dense cluster of deep purple calli in its centre. It is similar to the zabra orchid (Caladenia cairnsiana) but has smaller flowers and the lateral sepals do not clasp the ovary.

== Description ==
Caladenia pachychila is a terrestrial, perennial, deciduous, herb with an underground tuber and which often grows in clumps. It has a single erect, hairy leaf, 50–120 mm (2–5 in) long and about 5 mm (0.2 in) wide. One or two greenish-yellow and red flowers 20–30 mm (0.8–1 in) long and about 10 mm (0.4 in) wide are borne on a stalk 80–200 mm (3–8 in) tall. The dorsal sepal is erect, 10–15 mm (0.4–0.6 in) long and 1.5–3 mm (0.06–0.1 in) wide. The lateral sepals are 10–15 mm (0.4–0.6 in) long and 1.5–4 mm (0.06–0.2 in) wide and turn stiffly downwards but do not clasp the ovary. The petals are 8–15 mm (0.3–0.6 in) long, 1–2 mm (0.04–0.08 in) wide and arranged like the lateral sepals. The labellum is 8–12 mm (0.3–0.5 in) long, 7–10 mm (0.3–0.4 in) wide and greenish-cream with pale red lines. The sides of the labellum lack teeth but are rolled under and the tip has a thickened, red, V-shaped glandular tip and is curled under. There is a dense cluster of purplish-red calli in centre of the labellum. Flowering occurs from July to September.

== Taxonomy and naming ==
Caladenia pachychila was first described in 2001 by Stephen Hopper and Andrew Phillip Brown from a specimen collected near Salmon Gums and the description was published in Nuytsia. The specific epithet (pachychila) is derived from the Ancient Greek words pachys meaning "thick" and cheilos meaning "lip" or "rim" referring to the thickened tip of the labellum.

== Distribution and habitat ==
The dwarf zebra orchid is widely distributed between Kalbarri and Mount Ragged in the Cape Arid National Park. It grows in shrubland and mallee woodland, especially on rocky hills.

== Conservation ==
Caladenia pachychila is classified as "not threatened" by the Western Australian Government Department of Parks and Wildlife.
