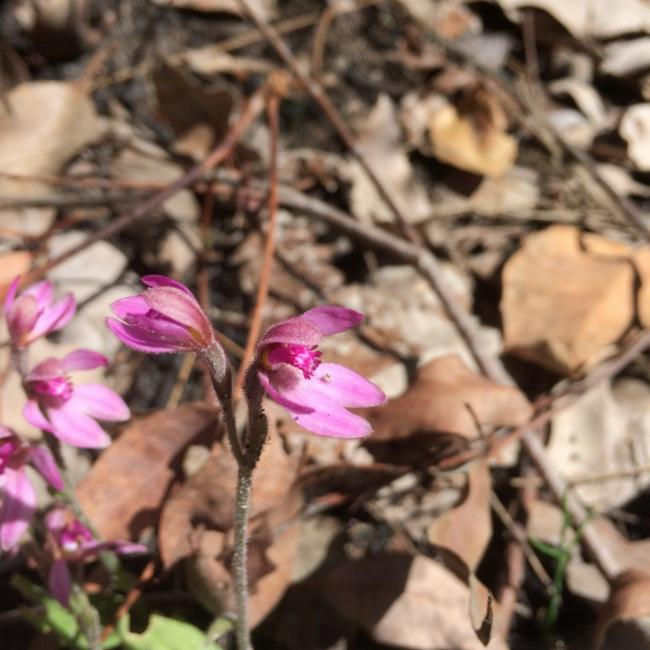

Scientific classification
- Kingdom: Plantae
- Clade: Tracheophytes
- Clade: Angiosperms
- Clade: Monocots
- Order: Asparagales
- Family: Orchidaceae
- Subfamily: Orchidoideae
- Tribe: Diurideae
- Genus: Caladenia
- Species: C. nana

Binomial name
- Caladenia nana Endl.

Synonyms
- Caladeniastrum nanum (Endl.) Szlach.

= Caladenia nana =

Pink fan orchid

Species of orchid

Caladenia nana, commonly known as pink fan orchid, is a plant in the orchid family Orchidaceae and is endemic to the south-west of Western Australia. It is a clump-forming ground orchid with a single linear leaf and up to 6 pale pink to rose pink flowers.

== Description ==
Caladenia nana is a terrestrial, perennial, deciduous herb that forms clumps. It has a single linear to broadly linear leaf, 50–180 mm (2.0–7.1 in) long and 3–10 mm (0.12–0.39 in) wide with a reddish-purple blotches near the base. Up to 6 pale pink to rose pink flowers 10–40 mm (0.39–1.57 in) 10–40 mm (0.39–1.57 in) wide are borne on a spike 50–400 mm (2.0–15.7 in) tall. The sepals and petals are broadly lance-shaped with glandular hairs on the back. The dorsal sepal is erect and curves forward, 7–17 mm (0.28–0.67 in) long and 2–7 mm (0.079–0.276 in) wide. The lateral sepals are 8–20 mm (0.31–0.79 in) long and 3–7 mm (0.12–0.28 in) wide, the petals 7–17 mm (0.28–0.67 in) long and 3–6 mm (0.12–0.24 in) wide. The labellum is white with pink blotches and markings, and is 5–12 mm (0.20–0.47 in) long 7–12 mm (0.28–0.47 in) wide with three lobes. Flowering occurs from August to November.

== Taxonomy and naming ==
Caladenia nana was first formally described in 1846 by Stephan Endlicher in Lehmann's Plantae Preissianae from specimens collected on Mount Clarence in 1840. The specific epithet (nana) means "dwarf".

In 2001, Stephen Hopper and Andrew Phillip Brown described two subspecies of Caladenia nana in the journal Nuytsia and the names are accepted by the Australian Plant Census:

- Caladenia nana R.Br. subsp. nana - little pink fan orchid, grows to 50–150 mm (2.0–5.9 in) tall and flowers from late August to October, with lateral sepals 8–10 mm (0.31–0.39 in) long and 3–5 mm (0.12–0.20 in) wide.
- Caladenia nana subsp. unita Hopper & A.P.Br. - pink fan orchid, grows to 150–400 mm (5.9–15.7 in) tall and flowers from October to November, with lateral sepals 11–19 mm (0.43–0.75 in) long and 5–7 mm (0.20–0.28 in) wide.

== Distribution and habitat ==
Caladenia nana grows in winter-wet flats and swamps in jarrah forest in the Avon Wheatbelt, Esperance Plains, Jarrah Forest, Swan Coastal Plain and Warren bioregions of south-western Western Australia.

== Conservation ==
Caladenia nana and both subspecies are classified as "not threatened" by the Western Australian Government Department of Parks and Wildlife.
