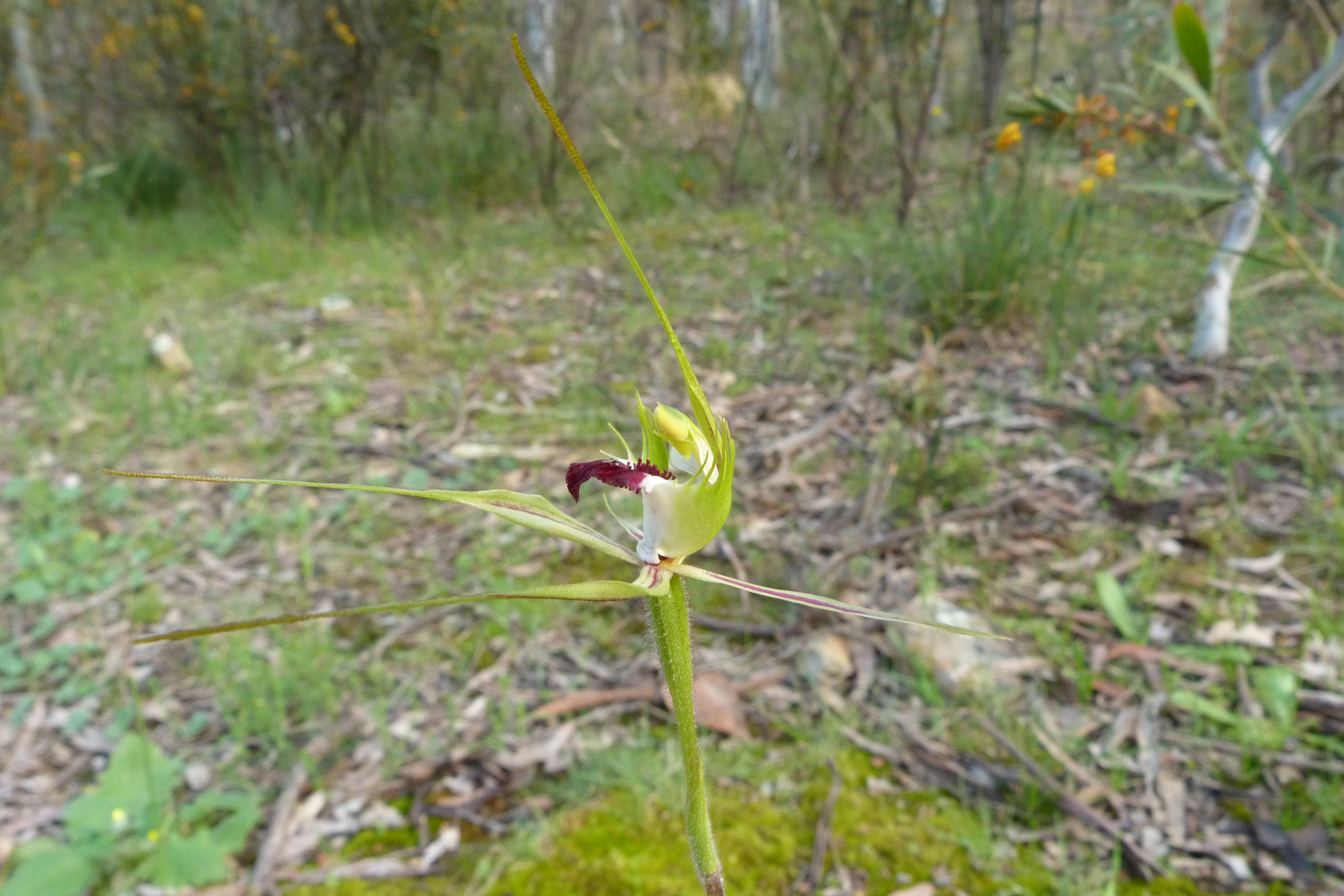
- Caladenia atrovespa growing on Black Mountain in the A.C.T.

Scientific classification
- Kingdom: Plantae
- Clade: Tracheophytes
- Clade: Angiosperms
- Clade: Monocots
- Order: Asparagales
- Family: Orchidaceae
- Subfamily: Orchidoideae
- Tribe: Diurideae
- Genus: Caladenia
- Species: C. atrochila

Binomial name
- Caladenia atrochila (D.L.Jones) G.N.Backh.

Synonyms
- Arachnorchis atrovespa D.L.Jones; Caladenia dilatata auct. non R.Br.: Gray, M. & MacKee, H.S. (1969); Caladenia dilatata auct. non R.Br.: Burbidge, N.T. & Gray, M. (1970)

= Caladenia atrovespa =

Thin-clubbed mantis orchid

Species of orchid

Caladenia atrovespa, commonly known as the thin-clubbed mantis orchid, is a plant in the orchid family Orchidaceae and is endemic to New South Wales. It is a terrestrial, perennial, deciduous, herb with an underground tuber and a single hairy leaf. It is similar to Caladenia tentaculata but has smaller flowers, sepals with narrower glandular tips, straight lateral sepals and a narrower labellum. The species was first formally described by David Jones who gave it the name Arachnorchis atrovespa in The Orchadian from a specimen collected on Black Mountain in the Australian Capital Territory. In 2010, Gary Backhouse transferred the species to Caladenia as C. atrovespa. The specific epithet (atrovespa) is derived from the Latin words atra meaning 'black' and vespa meaning 'wasp', referring to the large black thynnid that pollinates this orchid.

This caladenia grows on slopes and ridges in drier forests in southern New South Wales and the Australian Capital Territory.
