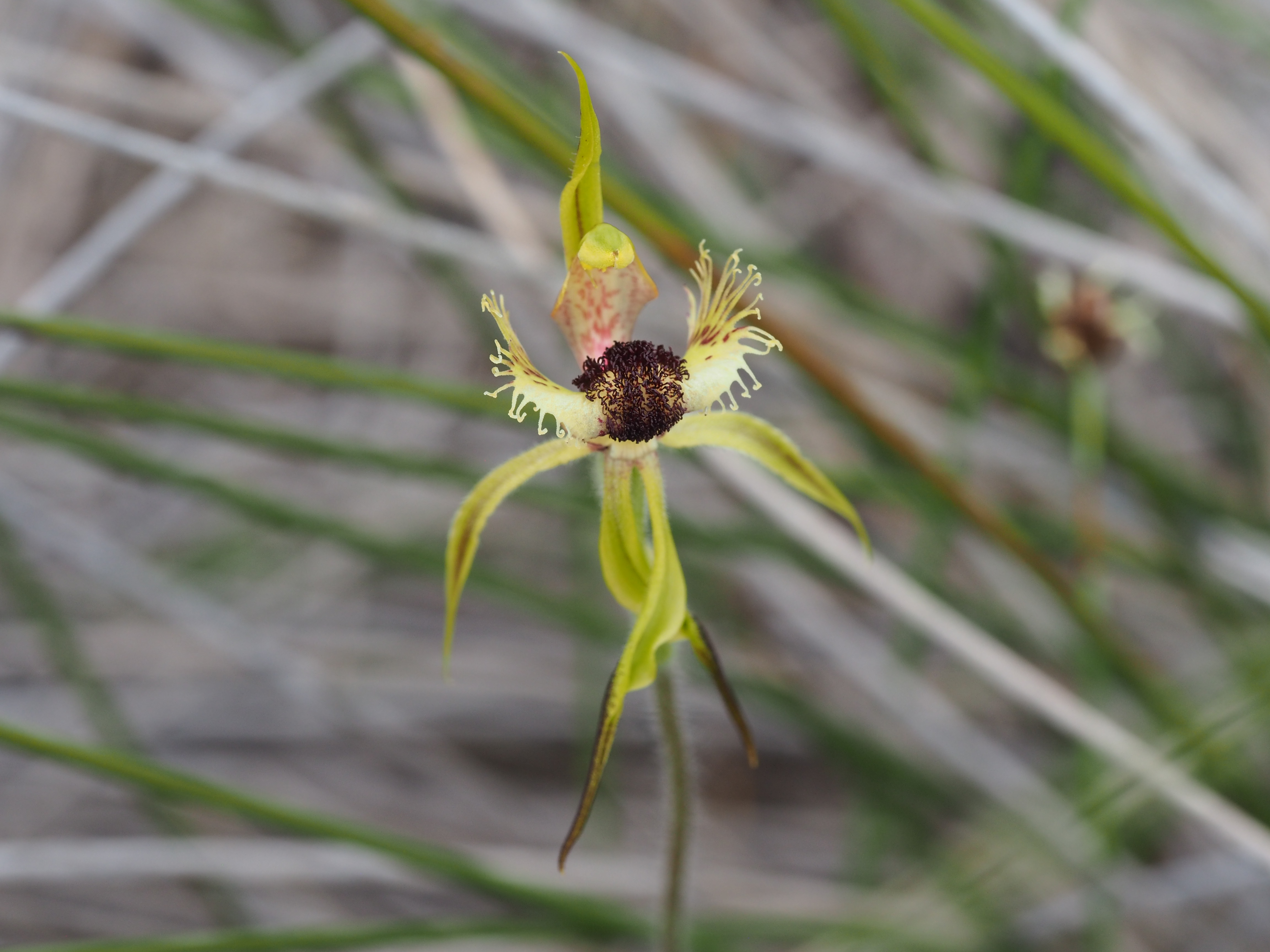
- Near Eneabba

Scientific classification
- Kingdom: Plantae
- Clade: Embryophytes
- Clade: Tracheophytes
- Clade: Spermatophytes
- Clade: Angiosperms
- Clade: Monocots
- Order: Asparagales
- Family: Orchidaceae
- Subfamily: Orchidoideae
- Tribe: Diurideae
- Genus: Caladenia
- Species: C. crebra

Binomial name
- Caladenia crebra A.S.George

Synonyms
- Arachnorchis crebra (A.S.George) D.L.Jones & M.A.Clem.; Calonema crebrum (A.S.George) Szlach.; Calonemorchis crebra (A.S.George) Szlach.

= Caladenia crebra =

Arrowsmith spider orchid

Species of orchid

Caladenia crebra, commonly known as the Arrowsmith spider orchid, is a species of orchid endemic to the south-west of Western Australia. It has one or two relatively large, greenish-yellow flowers whose lateral sepals have thin brown "clubs" on their ends.

== Description ==
Caladenia crebra is a terrestrial, perennial, deciduous, herb with an underground tuber and a single hairy leaf, 10–20 cm (4–8 in) long and 6–10 mm (0.2–0.4 in) wide. In August or September it produces one or two flowers on the end of a stalk 25–50 cm (10–20 in) tall, each flower 50–60 mm (2.0–2.4 in) wide. The flowers are greenish-yellow, sometimes with red markings. The dorsal sepal is erect, 25 mm (1 in) long and 3–5 mm (0.1–0.2 in) wide. The lateral sepals are 25–45 mm (1–2 in) long, 4–7 mm (0.2–0.3 in) wide and may spread widely below the flower or cross each other. The sepals have thin brown "clubs" 6–10 mm (0.2–0.4 in) on their ends. The petals are 25–30 mm (0.98–1.2 in) long, 3–4 mm (0.1–0.2 in) wide and curve backwards. The labellum is greenish-yellow, 12–15 mm (0.5–0.6 in) long, 10–12 mm (0.4–0.5 in) wide with many upturned, narrow teeth up to 6 mm (0.2 in) long, along its sides, often with hooks on their ends. There are many densely crowded, dark purplish, finger-like "calli" crowded in distinct rows in the central part of the labellum. Flowering occurs from August to September. The fruit is a non-fleshy, dehiscent capsule containing a large number of seeds.

== Taxonomy and naming ==
Caladenia crebra was first formally described by Alex George in 1971 and the description was published in Nuytsia from a specimen found south of Dongara. The specific epithet (crebra) is a Latin word meaning "crowded".

== Distribution and habitat ==
The Arrowsmith spider orchid is widespread and common between Dongara and Jurien Bay in the Geraldton Sandplains and Swan Coastal Plain biogeographic regions. It grows in shallow, sandy soil in low forest and shrubland.

== Conservation ==
Caladenia crebra is classified as "Not Threatened" by the Western Australian Government Department of Parks and Wildlife.
