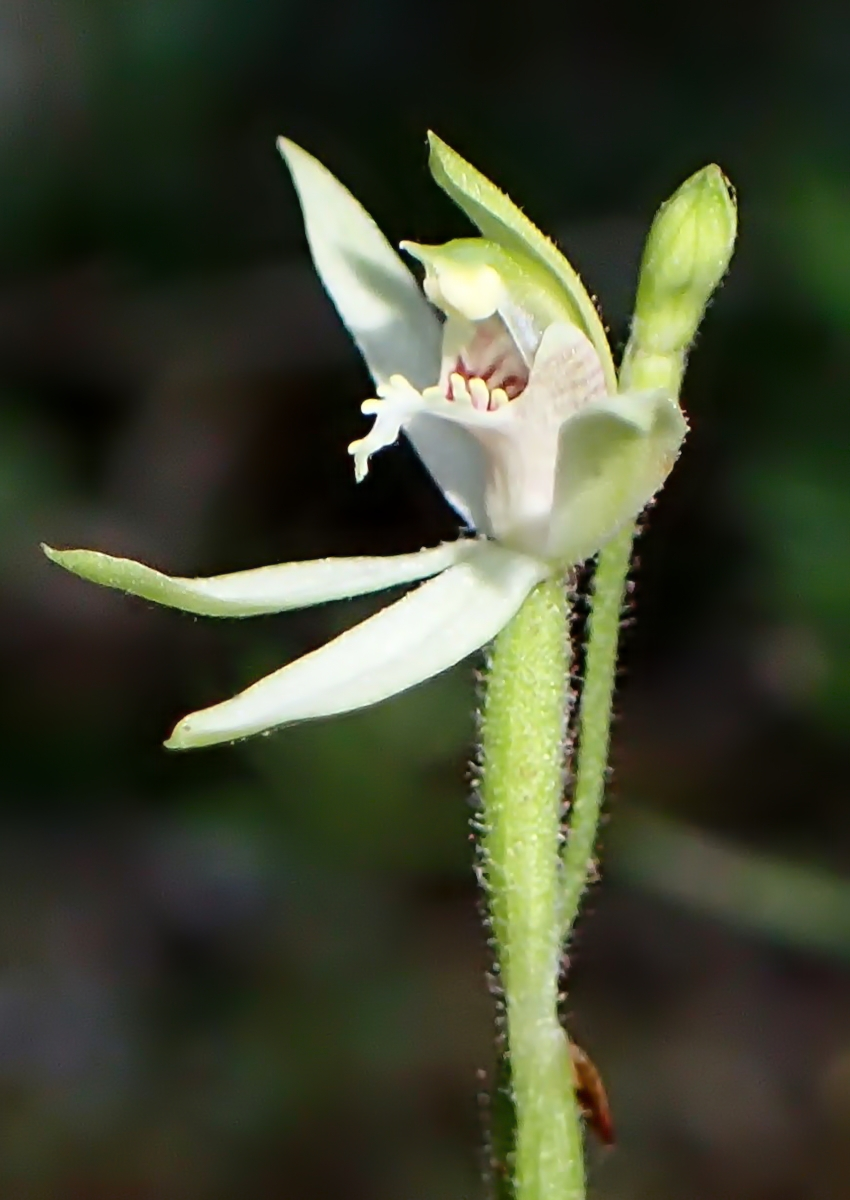
- Near Havelock, New Zealand

Scientific classification
- Kingdom: Plantae
- Clade: Embryophytes
- Clade: Tracheophytes
- Clade: Spermatophytes
- Clade: Angiosperms
- Clade: Monocots
- Order: Asparagales
- Family: Orchidaceae
- Subfamily: Orchidoideae
- Tribe: Diurideae
- Genus: Caladenia
- Species: C. chlorostyla

Binomial name
- Caladenia chlorostyla D.L.Jones, Molloy & M.A.Clem.

Synonyms
- Petalochilus chlorostylus (D.L.Jones) D.L.Jones & M.A.Clem.; Caladenia saccata (R.S.Rogers) Hopper and A.P.Br.

= Caladenia chlorostyla =

Species of orchid

Caladenia chlorostyla is a plant in the orchid family Orchidaceae and is endemic to New Zealand. It is a ground orchid with a single narrow, sparsely hairy leaf and a thin wiry stem usually bearing one pale mauve, pinkish or white flower.

== Description ==
C. chlorostyla is a terrestrial, perennial, deciduous, herb, usually occurring as a solitary individual. It has an underground tuber and a single sparsely hairy, bright green, narrow linear leaf up to 5–15 cm (2–6 in) long and 1–3 mm (0.04–0.1 in) wide.

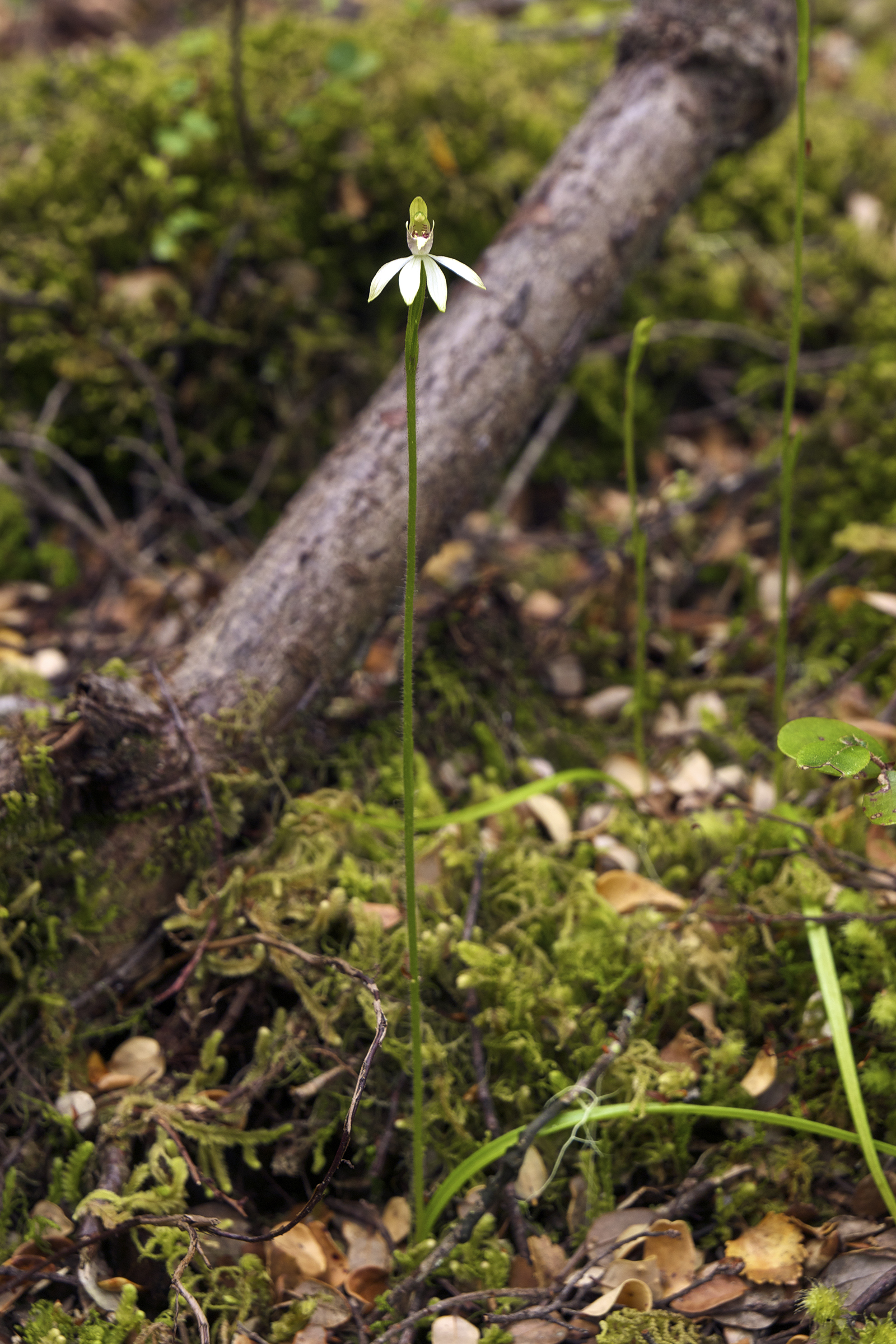
Caladenia chlorostyla habit, near the Kepler Track

One, sometimes up to five, unscented flowers up to 11–16 mm (0.4–0.6 in) in diameter are borne on a thin, wiry spike, 1–30 cm (0.4–10 in) tall. The sepals and petals are white, pale mauve or pinkish with greenish-white tips. The dorsal sepal is erect with its sides turned forwards, the lateral sepals are held horizontally and flat and the petals either spread widely or turn inwards. The dorsal sepal is 6–11 mm (0.2–0.4 in) long and narrow egg-shaped, the lateral sepals and petals are 6–8 mm (0.2–0.3 in), about 2 mm (0.08 in) wide, curved like a sickle and egg-shaped with the narrower end towards the base. The column is green with transverse red bars. Flowering occurs between September and January and is followed from December to April by the fruit which is a green, oval-shaped capsule 10–12 mm (0.4–0.5 in) long which sometimes has purple stripes.

== Taxonomy and naming ==
C. chlorostyla was first formally described in 1997 by David Jones, Brian Molloy and Mark Clements from a specimen collected by Clements near the Tinline River. The description was published in The Orchadian.

== Distribution and habitat ==
This caladenia grows in sunny position in scrub but also in old-growth forests and frequently in mature pine plantations.

C. saccata is regarded as a synonym of C. chlorostyla in New Zealand.

== Conservation ==
C. chlorostyla was classified in 2012 as "not threatened".
