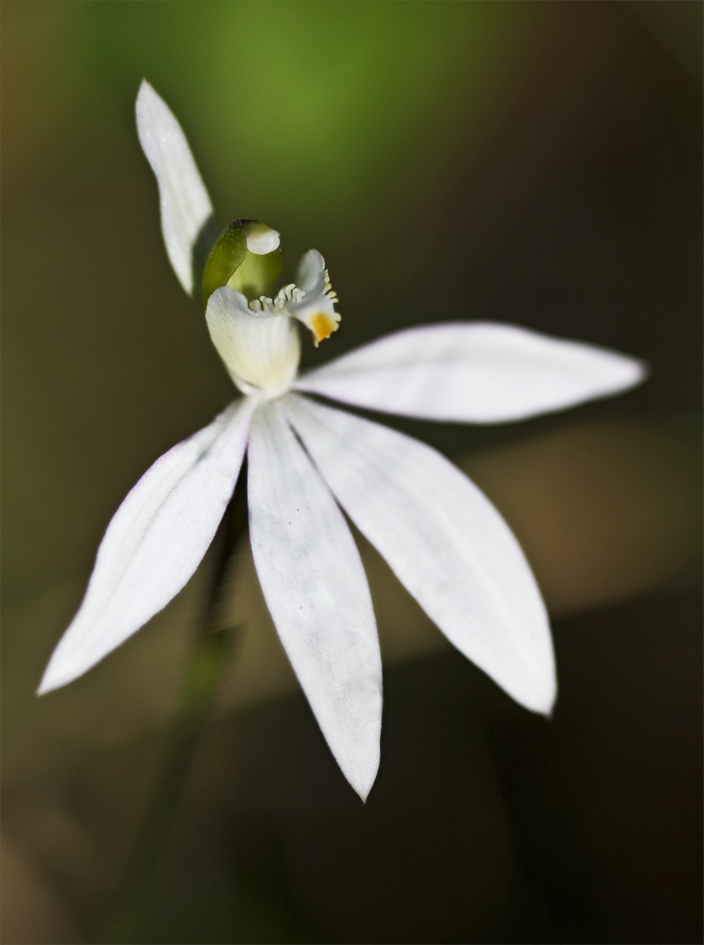

Scientific classification
- Kingdom: Plantae
- Clade: Embryophytes
- Clade: Tracheophytes
- Clade: Spermatophytes
- Clade: Angiosperms
- Clade: Monocots
- Order: Asparagales
- Family: Orchidaceae
- Subfamily: Orchidoideae
- Tribe: Diurideae
- Genus: Caladenia
- Species: C. catenata

Binomial name
- Caladenia catenata (Sm.) Druce

Synonyms
- Arethusa catenata Sm.; Petalochilus catenatus (Sm.) D.L.Jones & M.A.Clem

= Caladenia catenata =

White caladenia

Species of orchid endemic to Australia

Caladenia catenata, commonly known as white caladenia, white fingers and lady's fingers, is an Australian plant in the orchid family Orchidaceae and is endemic to New South Wales, Queensland and Victoria. It is a ground orchid with a single hairy leaf and one or two white, sometimes pink flowers on a thin, sparsely-hairy stem. It is similar to Caladenia carnea but lacks the red and white bars on the labellum of that species.

== Description ==
Caladenia catenata is a terrestrial, perennial, deciduous, herb with an underground tuber and a single, sparsely hairy, linear leaf, 6–14 cm (2–6 in) long and 3–4 mm (0.1–0.2 in) wide.

There are one or two flowers borne on a slender, sparsely hairy spike 10–30 cm (4–10 in) high. The sepals and petals are glistening white, rarely pink and are sparsely hairy on the lower part of their backs. The dorsal sepal is linear to oblong, erect or slightly curved forward and is 15–22 mm (0.6–0.9 in) long. The lateral sepals and petals are about the same length as the dorsal sepal and spreading. The labellum is white or pinkish with a yellowy-orange tip. It is 8–10 mm (0.3–0.4 in) long, 6–18 mm (0.2–0.7 in) wide when flattened and has three lobes. The central lobe is triangle-shaped, longer than the lateral lobes, curves downward and has finger-like teeth on its edges. The lateral lobes are narrow and may have a few teeth near their tips. There are two rows of yellow or white, club-shaped calli on the centre of the mid-lobe but only as far forward as the front of the lateral lobes. Flowering occurs from August to November, earlier in New South Wales than Victoria.

This caladenia is similar to C. carnea but differs from it in not having red and white bars on the labellum. In some places, hybrids between the two species occur.

== Taxonomy and naming ==
The first formal description of this orchid was by James Edward Smith in 1805, who gave it the name Arethusa catenata and published the description in his book, Exotic Botany. In 1917, George Druce changed the name to Caladenia catenata and published the change in The Botanical Exchange Club and Society of the British Isles Report for 1916, Supplement 2. The specific epithet (catenata) is a Latin word meaning "chained". In his description, Smith referred to the labellum as having "chain-like glands".

== Distribution and habitat ==
This caladenia is uncommon in Victoria where it grows in scattered populations in forest and woodland east of Melbourne. It is more common in New South Wales where it usually grows in sandy soil in coastal forest and shrubland. It is probably the most common Caladenia in the Sydney region.
