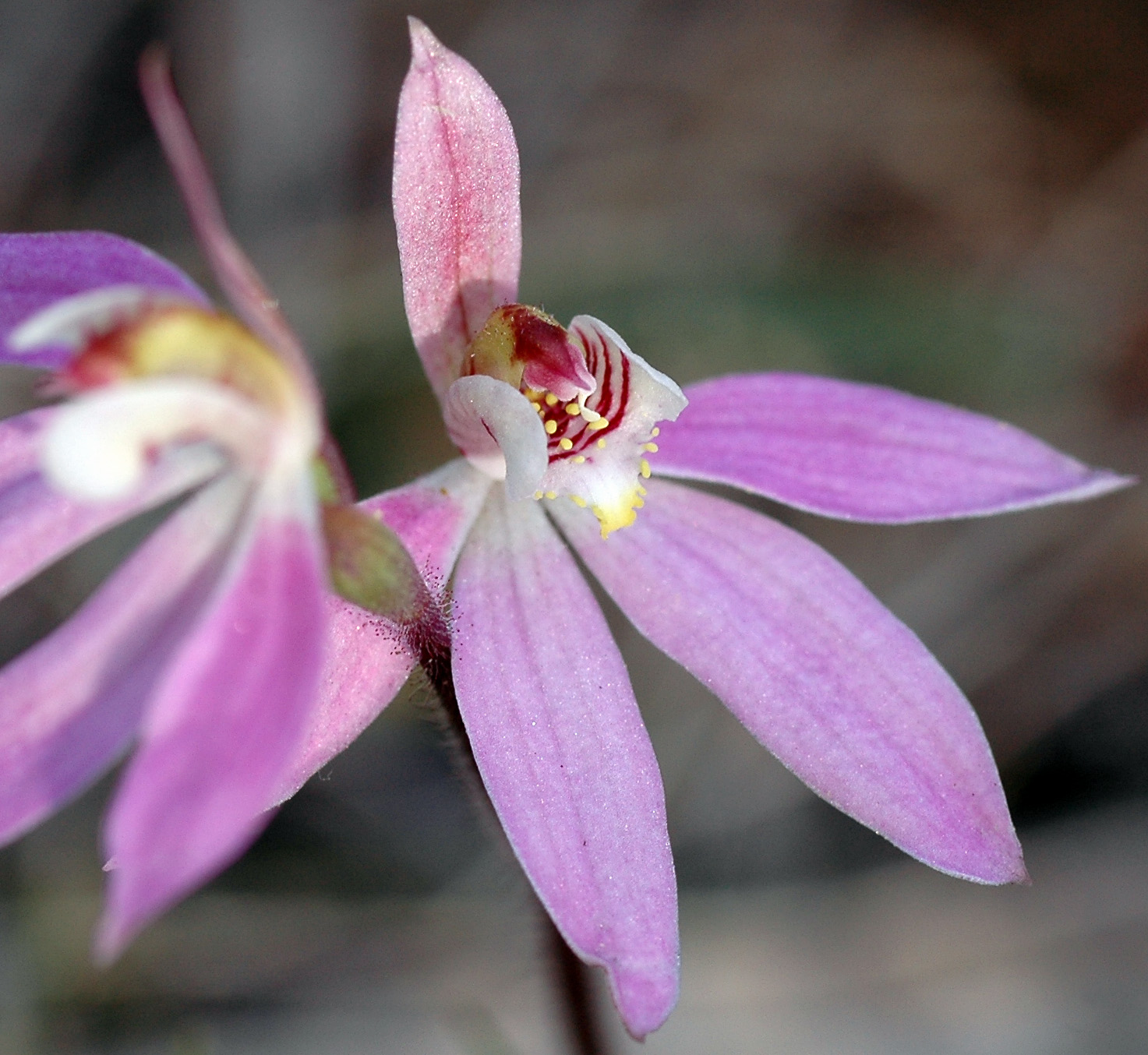
- C. carnea growing in Tasmania

Scientific classification
- Kingdom: Plantae
- Clade: Embryophytes
- Clade: Tracheophytes
- Clade: Spermatophytes
- Clade: Angiosperms
- Clade: Monocots
- Order: Asparagales
- Family: Orchidaceae
- Subfamily: Orchidoideae
- Tribe: Diurideae
- Subtribe: Caladeniinae
- Genus: Caladenia; R.Br.

Species
- List of Caladenia species

Synonyms
- List: Arachnorchis D.L.Jones & M.A.Clem.; Caladeniastrum (Szlach.) Szlach.; Calonema (Lindl.) Wittst. nom. illeg.; Calonemorchis Szlach.; Cyanicula Hopper & A.P.Br.; Drakonorchis (Hopper & A.P.Br.) D.L.Jones & M.A.Clem.; Elythranthera (Endl.) A.S.George; Ericksonella Hopper & A.P.Br.; Glossodia R.Br.; Glycorchis D.L.Jones & M.A.Clem.; Jonesiopsis Szlach.; Pentisea (Lindl.) Szlach.; Petalochilus R.S.Rogers; Phlebochilus (Benth.) Szlach.; Stegostyla D.L.Jones & M.A.Clem.

= Caladenia =

Spider orchids

Genus of orchids

Caladenia, commonly known as spider orchids, is a genus of 350 species of plants in the orchid family, Orchidaceae. Spider orchids are terrestrial herbs with a single hairy leaf and a hairy stem. The labellum is fringed or toothed in most species and there are small projections called calli on the labellum. The flowers have adaptations to attract particular species of insects for pollination. The genus is divided into three groups on the basis of flower shape, broadly, spider orchids, zebra orchids and cowslip orchids, although other common names are often used. Although they occur in other countries, most are Australian and 136 species occur in Western Australia, making it the most species-rich orchid genus in that state.

== Description ==
Orchids in the genus Caladenia are terrestrial, perennial, deciduous, sympodial herbs with a few inconspicuous, fine roots and a tuber partly surrounded by a fibrous sheath. The tuber produces two "droppers" which become daughter tubers in the following year. There is a single hairy convolute leaf at the base of the plant. Most species have an enlarged cell at the base of each hair. The leaf may be medium-sized to large, fleshy or leathery, lance-shaped to oblong, but is always simple, lacking lobes and serrations.

The inflorescence is a raceme with from one to eight resupinate flowers. The three sepals and two petals are free and similar in size and shape to each other. In some species, the sepals or petals or both have narrow tips with club-like ends. As is usual in orchids, one petal is highly modified as the central labellum. The labellum is divided into three parts, each of which usually has a fringed or dentate margin, while the central lobe has stalked or button-like calli which are often in rows. The sexual parts of the flower are fused to the column, which has wing-like structures on its sides. Most species flower in early spring but some species, such as the winter spider orchid (C. drummondii) flower in other months. The fruit that follows flowering is a non-fleshy, dehiscent capsule containing up to 500 seeds.

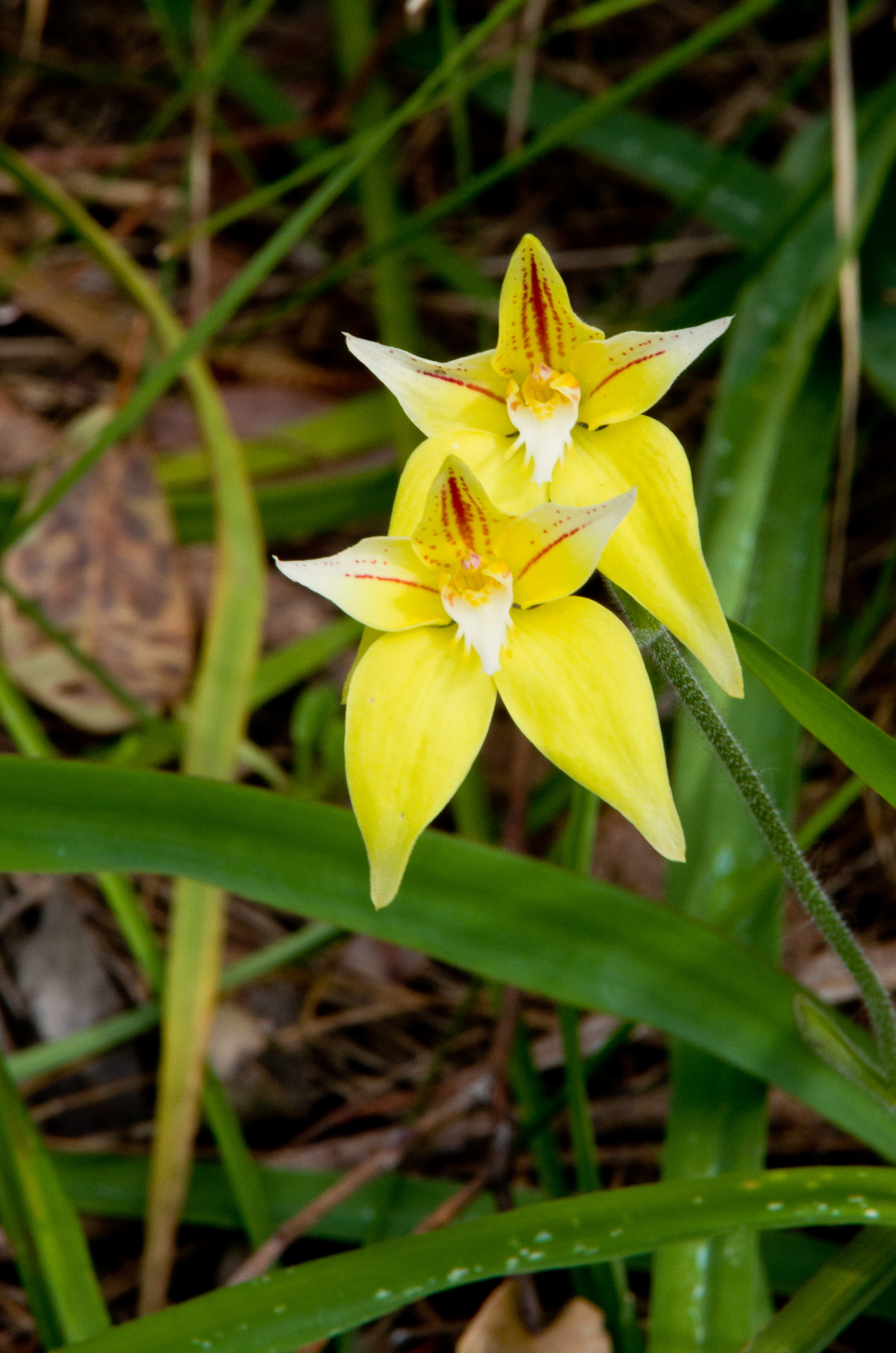
C. flava growing near Bertram, W.A.

== Taxonomy and naming ==
The first specimens of the genus were collected by Joseph Banks in Sydney in 1777 and by Archibald Menzies in King George Sound in Western Australia in 1784. James Edward Smith formally described Arethusa catenata, now known as Caladenia catenata in 1805, from specimens collected in Sydney.

The genus was first formally described by Robert Brown in 1810 in Prodromus Florae Novae Hollandiae. At the same time he described 15 species of Caladenia but did not nominate a type species. Brown collected the specimens as a member of Matthew Flinders' mapping and exploration voyage that circumnavigated Australia. He spent just over three years on botanical research with assistants in Australia.

The genus name (Caladenia) is derived from the Ancient Greek words kalos meaning "beautiful" and aden meaning "a gland" referring to the colourful labellum.

There has been disagreement between taxonomists as to which orchids belong in the genus Caladenia and which do not, and about classification within the genus. Recent studies of the molecular phylogenetics of the group suggest that John Lindley’s 1840 description of Caladenia (in The Genera and Species of Orchidaceous Plants), but including Glossodia and Elythranthera, as being the most accurate reflection of the subtribe Caladeniinae. Those orchids previously included in the genera Glossodia, Elythranthera and Cyanicula have been transferred to Caladenia.

Caladenia orchids are informally grouped into those with long narrow sepals and petals, such as the white spider orchid (C. longicauda) and the clubbed spider orchid (C. longiclavata), those with short sepals and petals which tend to hang near the stem, such as the zebra orchid (C. cairnsiana) and dwarf zebra orchid (C. pachychila) and a third group with short, spreading sepals and petals such as the cowslip orchid (C. flava) and fan orchid (C. nana).

== Distribution and habitat ==
Most caladenias are endemic to Australia. Eleven species, ten of which are endemic, occur in New Zealand with one also occurring in Australia. Caladenia catenata and C. carnea occur in New Caledonia, with the latter also found in Indonesia. There are about 136 species endemic to the south-west of Western Australia, 114 of which have been formally described and a further 18 hybrids which have been described and named.

In Western Australia, caladenias are found in the south-west from north of Kalbarri on the west coast to the Nuytsland Nature Reserve on the coast of the Great Australian Bight. Their habitats range from cool, moist karri forest, to swamplands near the coast and to almost arid mallee woodland.

== Ecology ==
Orchids in the genus Caladenia are pollinated by insects, usually bees or wasps. Some species appear to attract male wasps by having the scent, shape and colouration of flightless female wasps. For example, C. lobata attracts male Thynnoides bidens wasps. As the wasps lands on the flower, the labellum is pulled down by the insect's weight. As it moves up the labellum, that organ tips the insect against the column where the wasp contacts the sexual parts and either picks up or deposits pollinia. Many such orchids are only attractive to one species of insect. Sometimes hybrids between female-mimicking and food-attracting species occur as in the case of C. patersonii which has the odour of fermentation. C. patersonii attracts several insect species, and forms hybrids with insect-mimicking species including C. lobata and C. dilatata.

In some caladenias, the sepal and petals (apart from the labellum) are narrow with expanded tips called "clubs". These are thought to be the source of sexual attractants for those species that mimic female wasps. Most such species do not have a scent detectable by humans but are attractive to male Thynnid wasps. For some species, such as C. multiclavia, it is the labellum that mimics the size, shape and presumably the scent of females.

== Use in horticulture ==
Caladenia have generally proven difficult to maintain and cultivate artificially. Some enthusiasts have had limited success by cultivating the symbiotic fungus that the orchid requires and by careful use of fertiliser to keep the fungus and orchid in balance. The 1889 book 'The Useful Native Plants of Australia' records that "These and other orchids have edible tubers."

=== Gallery ===
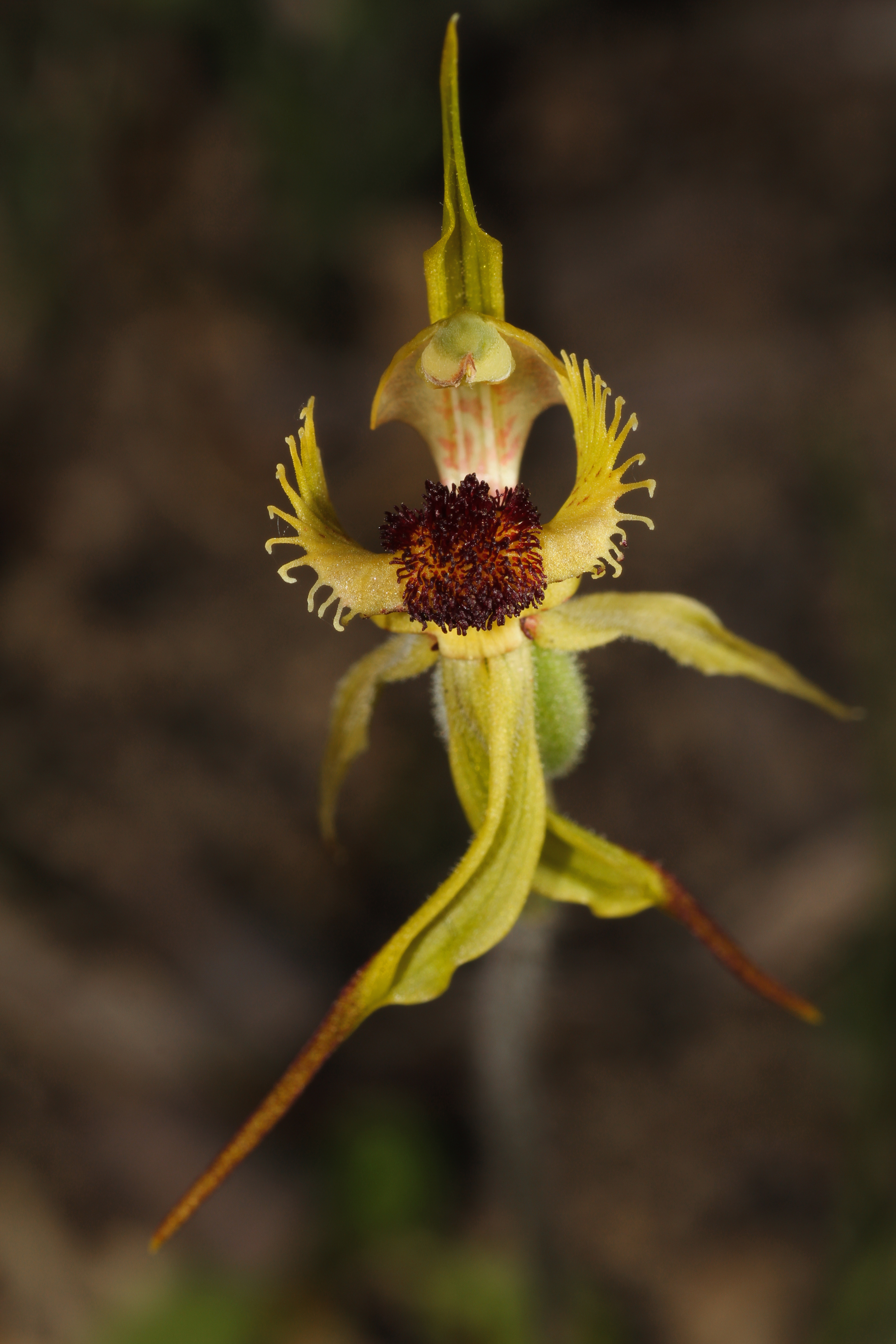
Arrowsmith spider orchid (C. crebra)

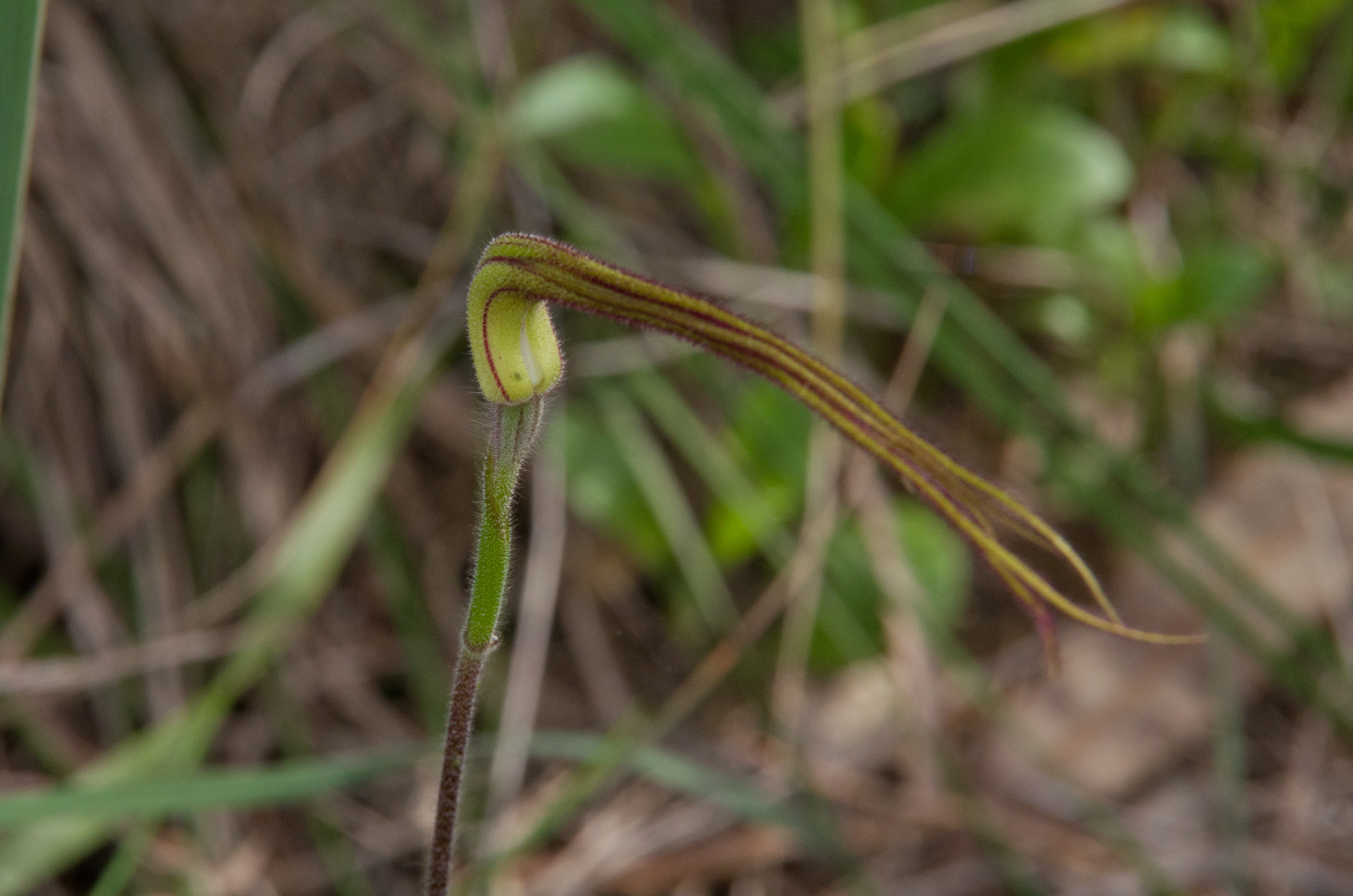
Clubbed spider orchid (C. longicauda) budding

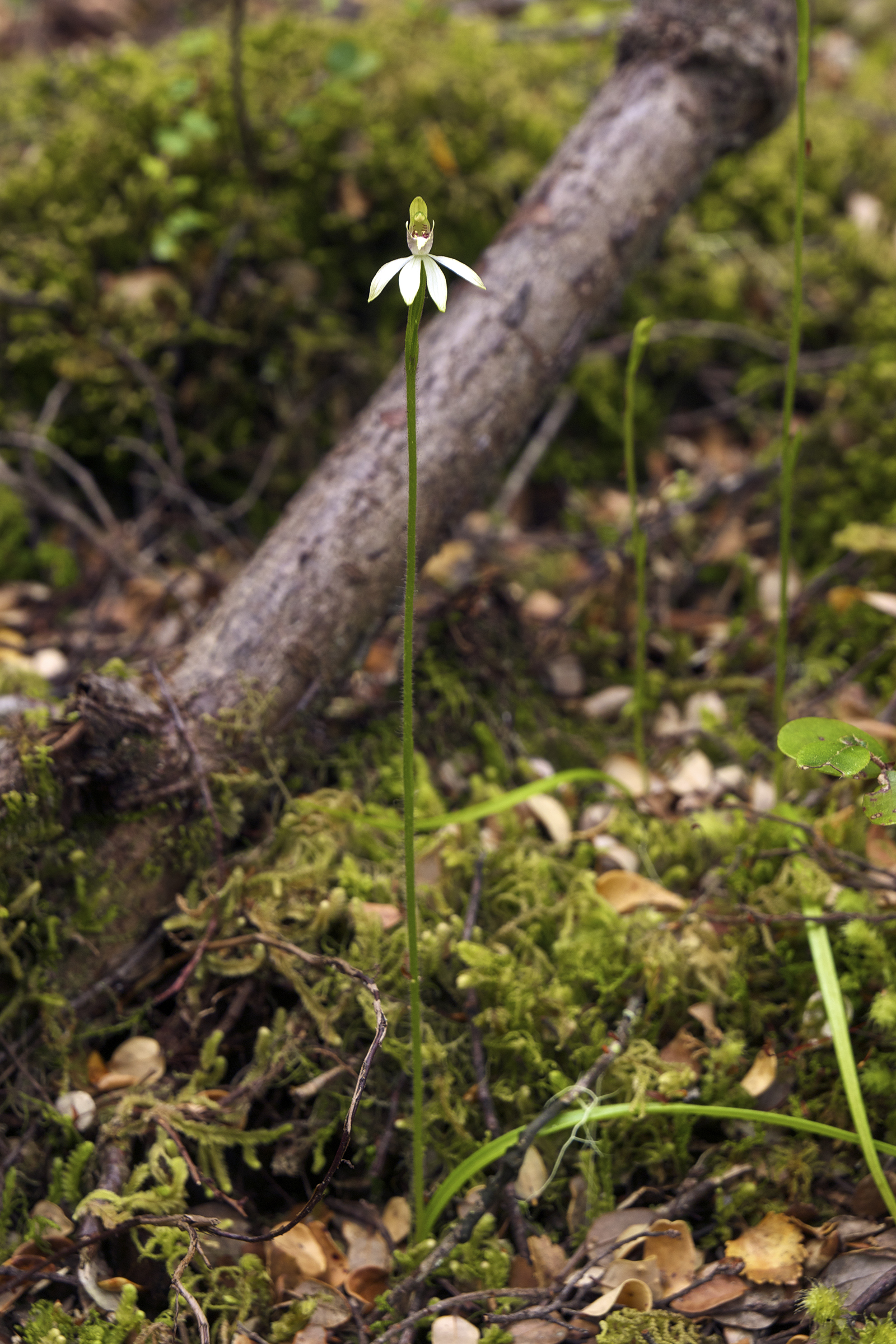
White fingers (C. chlorostyla), from New Zealand

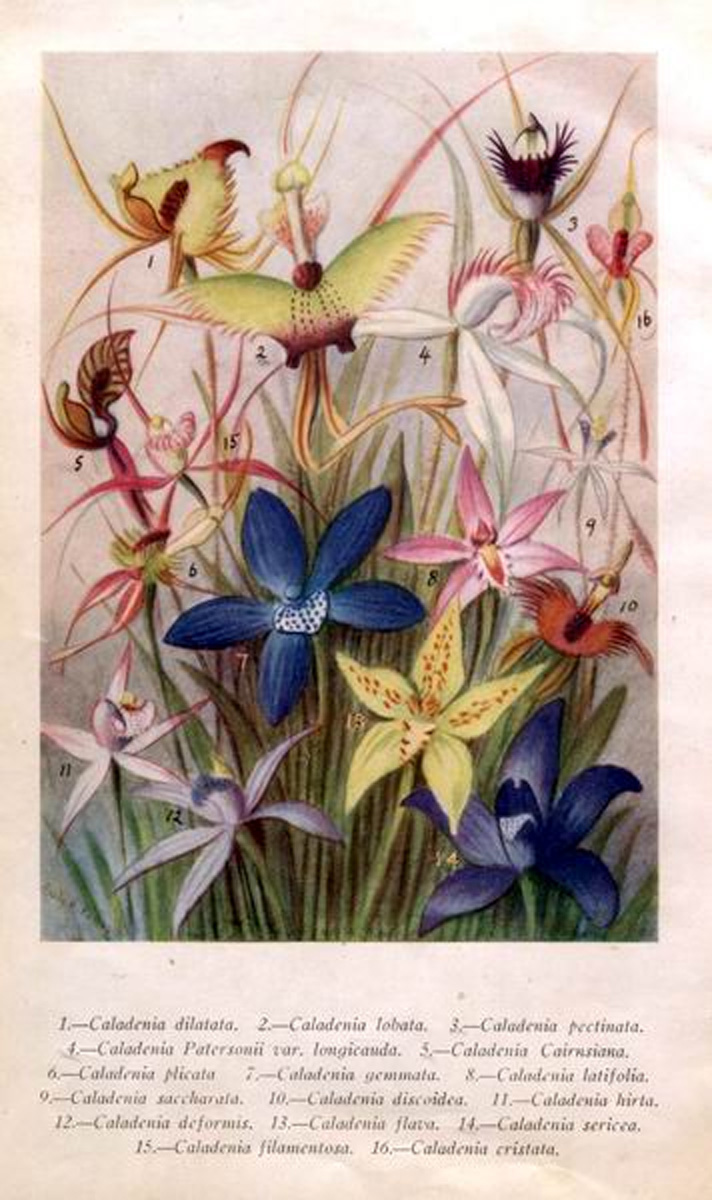
Several Caladenia species from Pelloe's West Australia Orchids

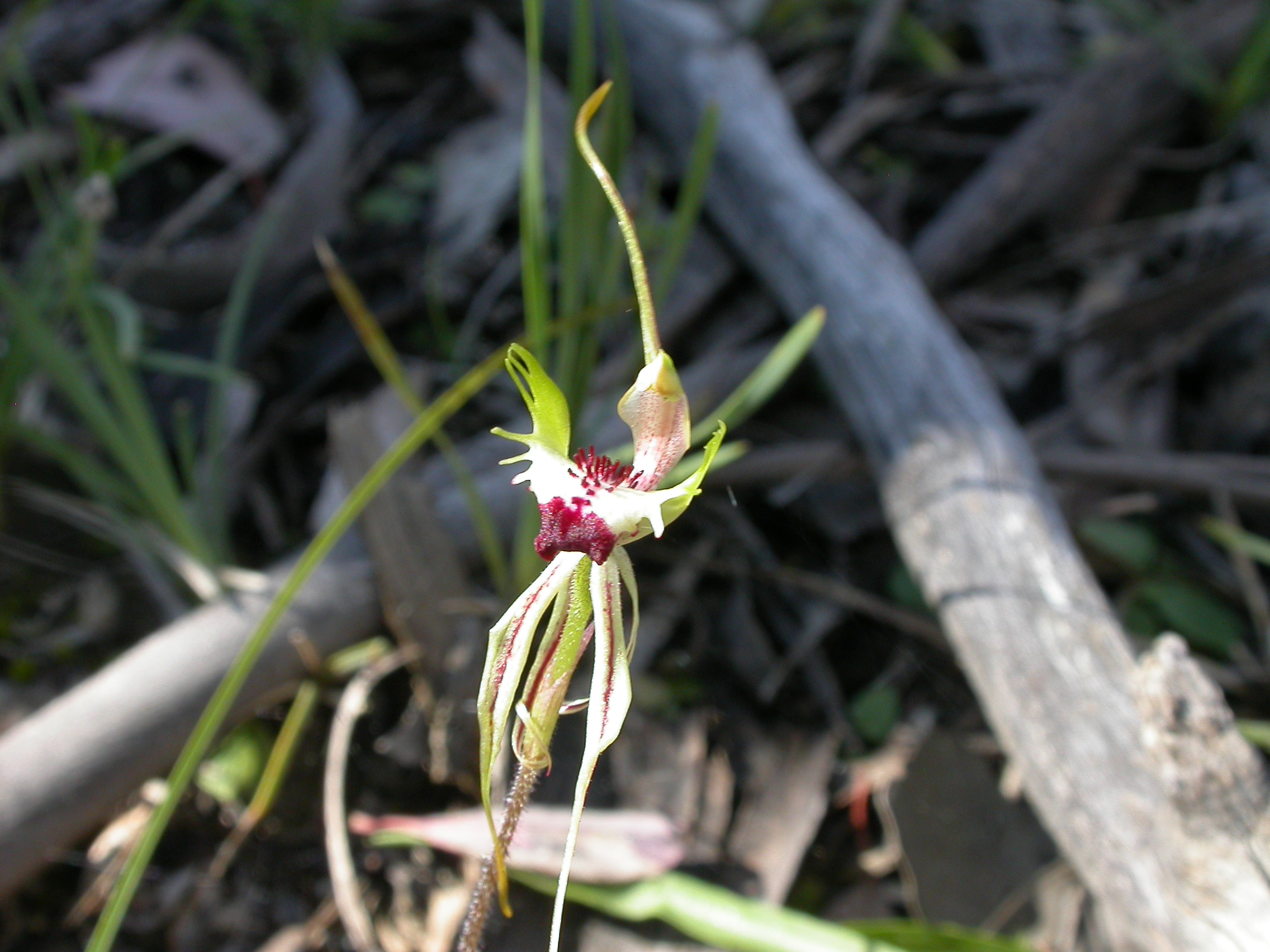
C. atrovespa growing near Canberra

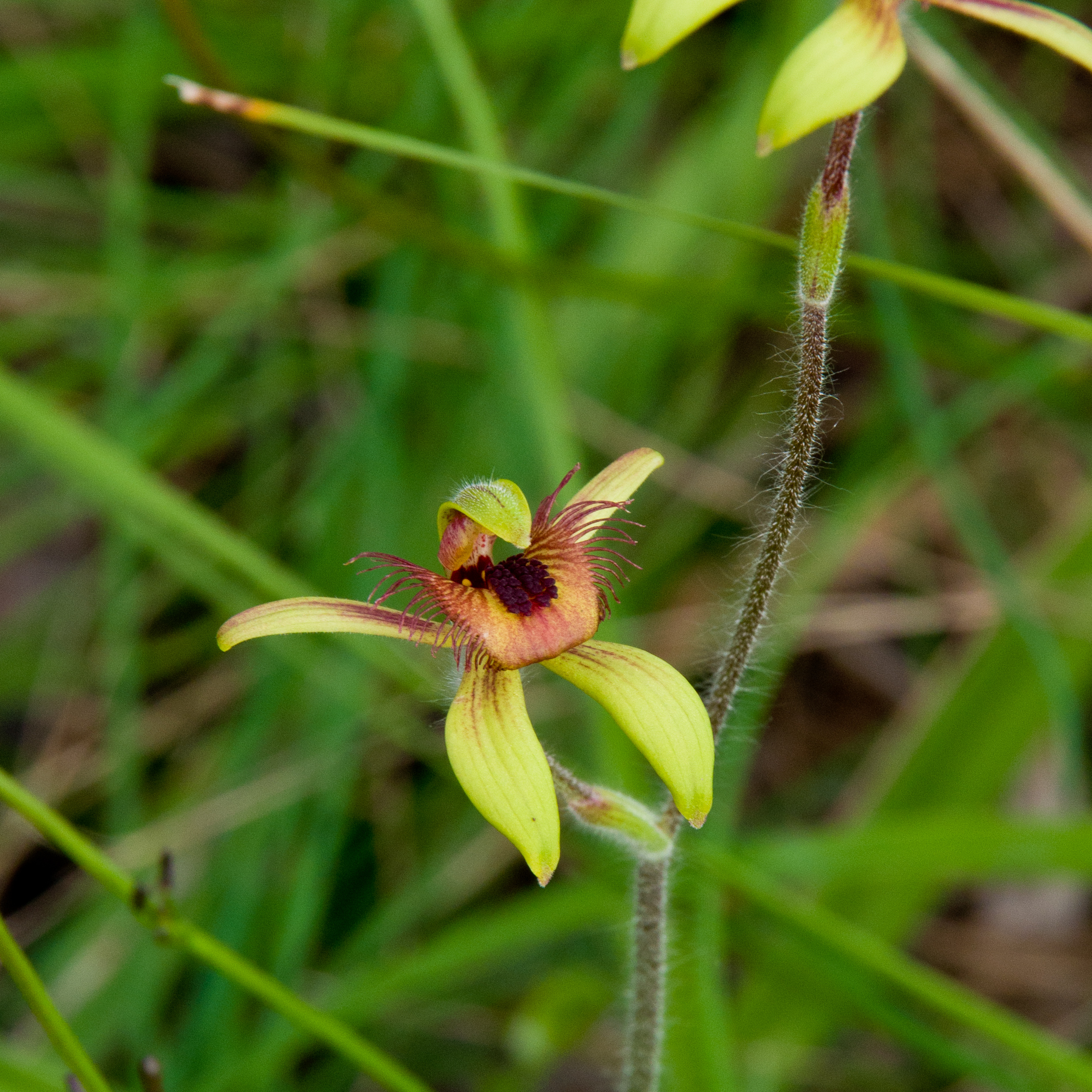
Dancing spider (C. discoidea) growing near Perth

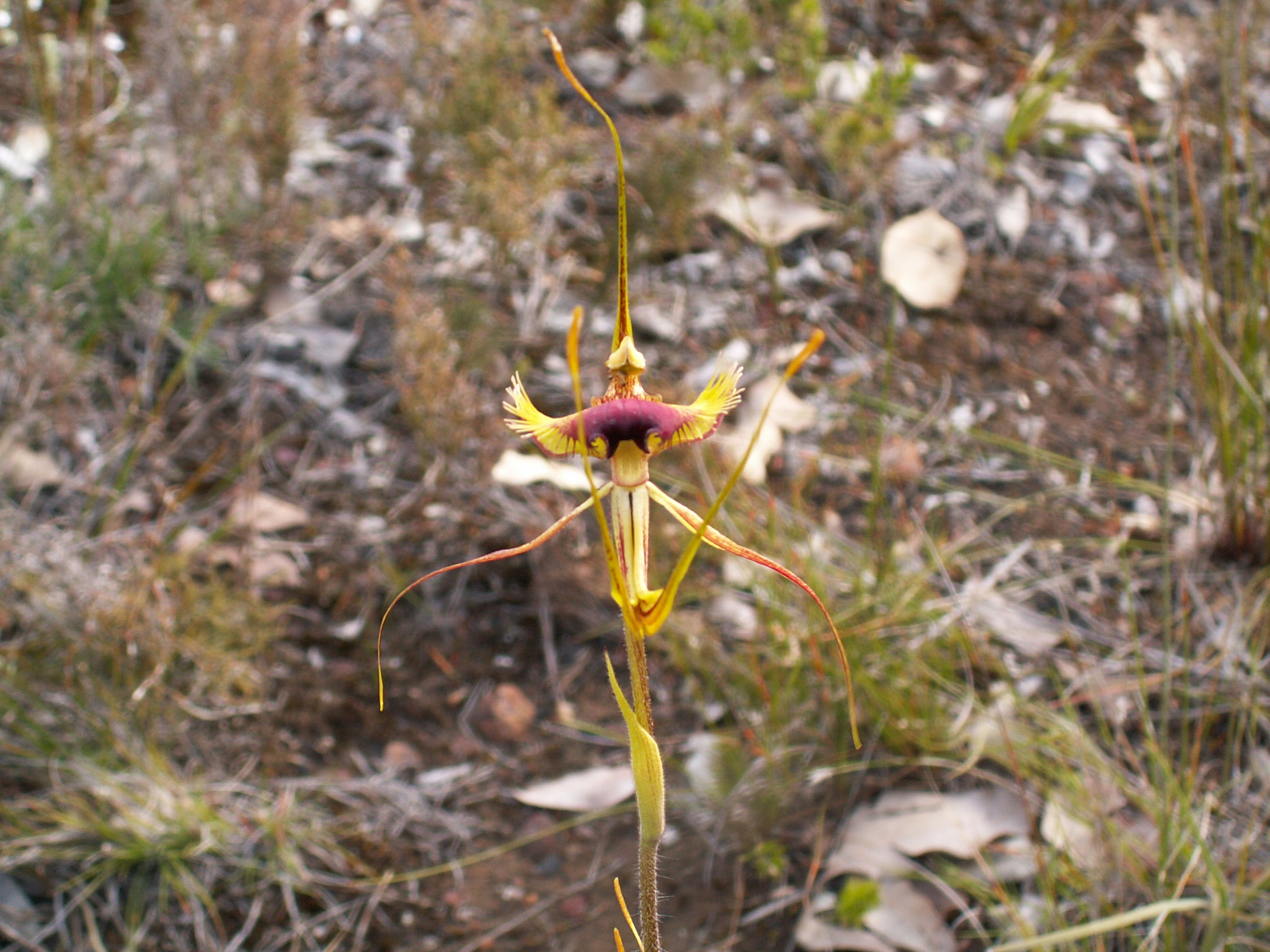
Butterfly orchid (C. lobata) near Mount Barker

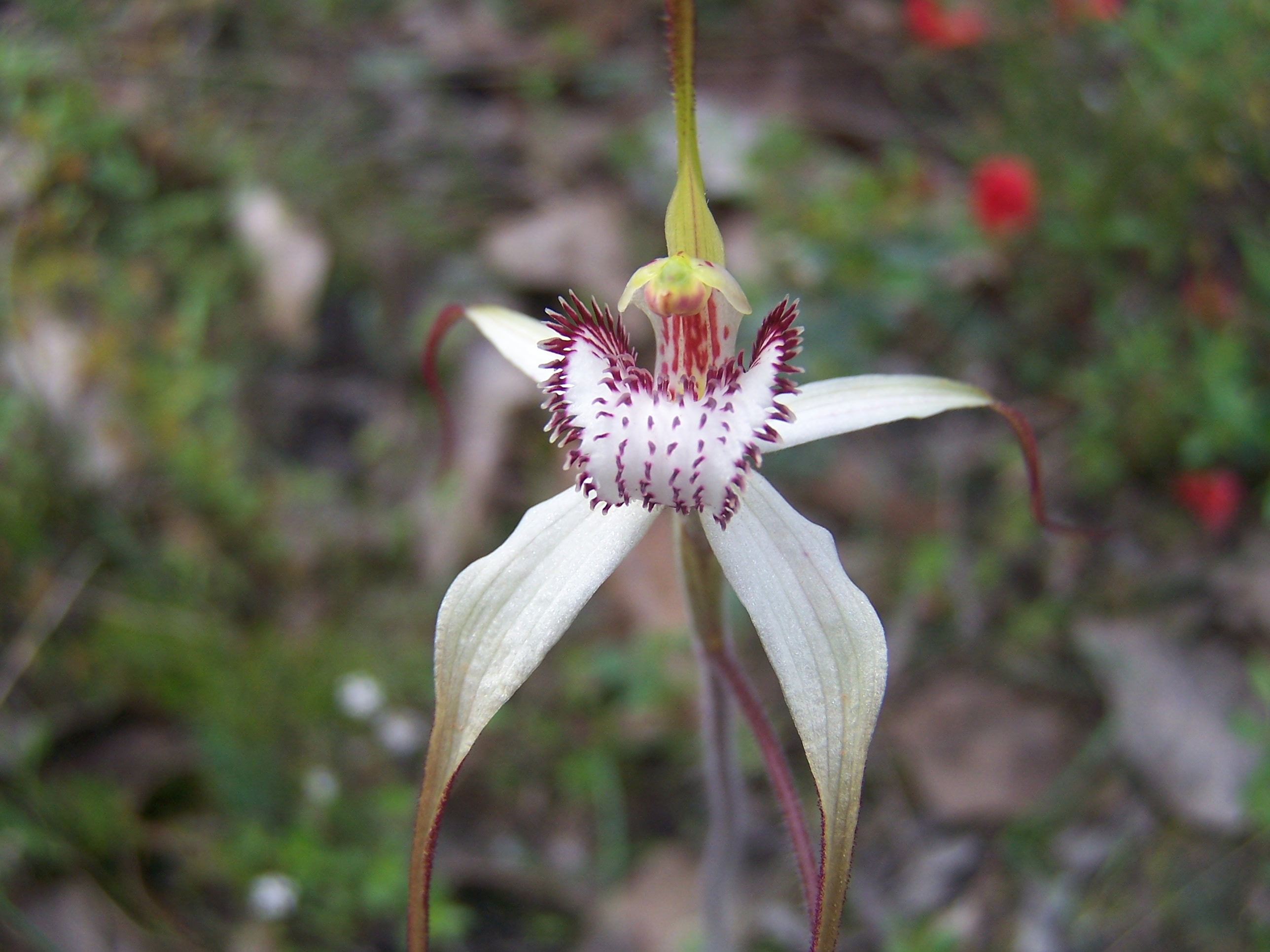
Large white spider orchid (C. venusta)

== See also ==
- List of Caladenia species
