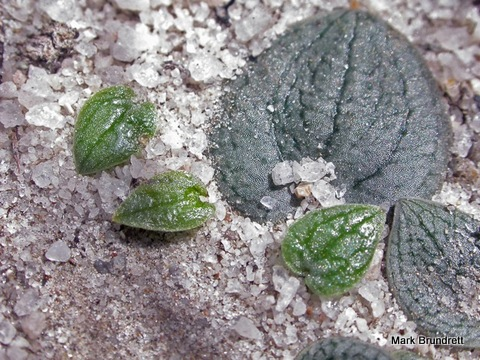
- Immature and mature leaves of Drakaea isolata

Conservation status
- Endangered (EPBC Act)

Scientific classification
- Kingdom: Plantae
- Clade: Tracheophytes
- Clade: Angiosperms
- Clade: Monocots
- Order: Asparagales
- Family: Orchidaceae
- Subfamily: Orchidoideae
- Tribe: Diurideae
- Genus: Drakaea
- Species: D. isolata

Binomial name
- Drakaea isolata Hopper & A.P.Br. (2007)

= Drakaea isolata =

Species of orchid endemic to Western Australia

Drakaea isolata, commonly known as lonely hammer orchid, is a species of orchid endemic to the south–west of Western Australia. It is pollinated by a single species of male thynnid wasp using sexual deception. The orchid's labellum is similar in shape and scent to a flightless female thynnid wasp. It is known from only one population and has been declared "endangered" by the Australian government and "threatened" by the government of Western Australia. It was first collected in 1984 by Robert J. Bates. No other Drakaea species is found it the same area but the broad-billed duck orchid (Paracaleana triens) is found nearby.

== Description ==
Drakaea isolata is similar to others in the genus in that it has a single, ground hugging leaf and an underground tuber. In this case, the leaf is heart shaped, about 12 millimetres (0.5 in) in diameter and is often withered by the time the flower opens. The leaf is covered with tiny lumps or short hairs, blue-grey with darker lines radiating from the attachment to the stem. The stem is 10–30 centimetres (4–10 in) long and the stalk of the single flower is 10–15 millimetres (0.4–0.6 in) long.

The flower is also similar to those of other hammer orchids in that the labellum resembles a flightless female thynnid wasp, except that in this species the column is pointed, the labellum lacks an upturned end and the main body of the labellum has long hairs and a longer narrow "neck". The sepal at the back of the flower is 8–12 millimetres (0.3–0.5 in) long and the two at the sides are 6–8 millimetres (0.2–0.3 in). The petals are also 6–8 millimetres (0.2–0.3 in) long. The insect-like labellum has a "head" about one-third long as the "body" and has a pair of dark projections near its base . The rest of the labellum (representing the female "body" of the insect) is dark maroon in colour, glabrous and not swollen as in Drakaea glyptodon. The flower is similar to that of Drakaea confluens but is smaller and more uniform in colour. Flowers appear from September to the middle of October.

== Taxonomy and naming ==
Drakaea isolata was first formally described by Stephen Hopper and Andrew Brown in 2007. Their description was published in Australian Systematic Botany. The specific epithet (isolata) is a Latin word meaning "isolated" in reference to this species of hammer orchid being found well away from others.

== Distribution and habitat ==
Lonely hammer orchid occurs near Pingrup in the Mallee biogeographic region where it grows in sand near a salt lake.

== Conservation ==
The Western Australian Government Department of Parks and Wildlife classifies the species as "threatened" meaning that it is considered likely to become extinct, or rare and in need of special protection. In 2003, the entire population of the species was estimated to be about 75 mature plants and a number of immature ones. The Australian Government lists its status under the Environmental Protection and Biodiversity Conservation Act as "endangered". The main threats to the species' survival are road and track maintenance, airborne dust, changes to groundwater levels and inappropriate fire regimes.
