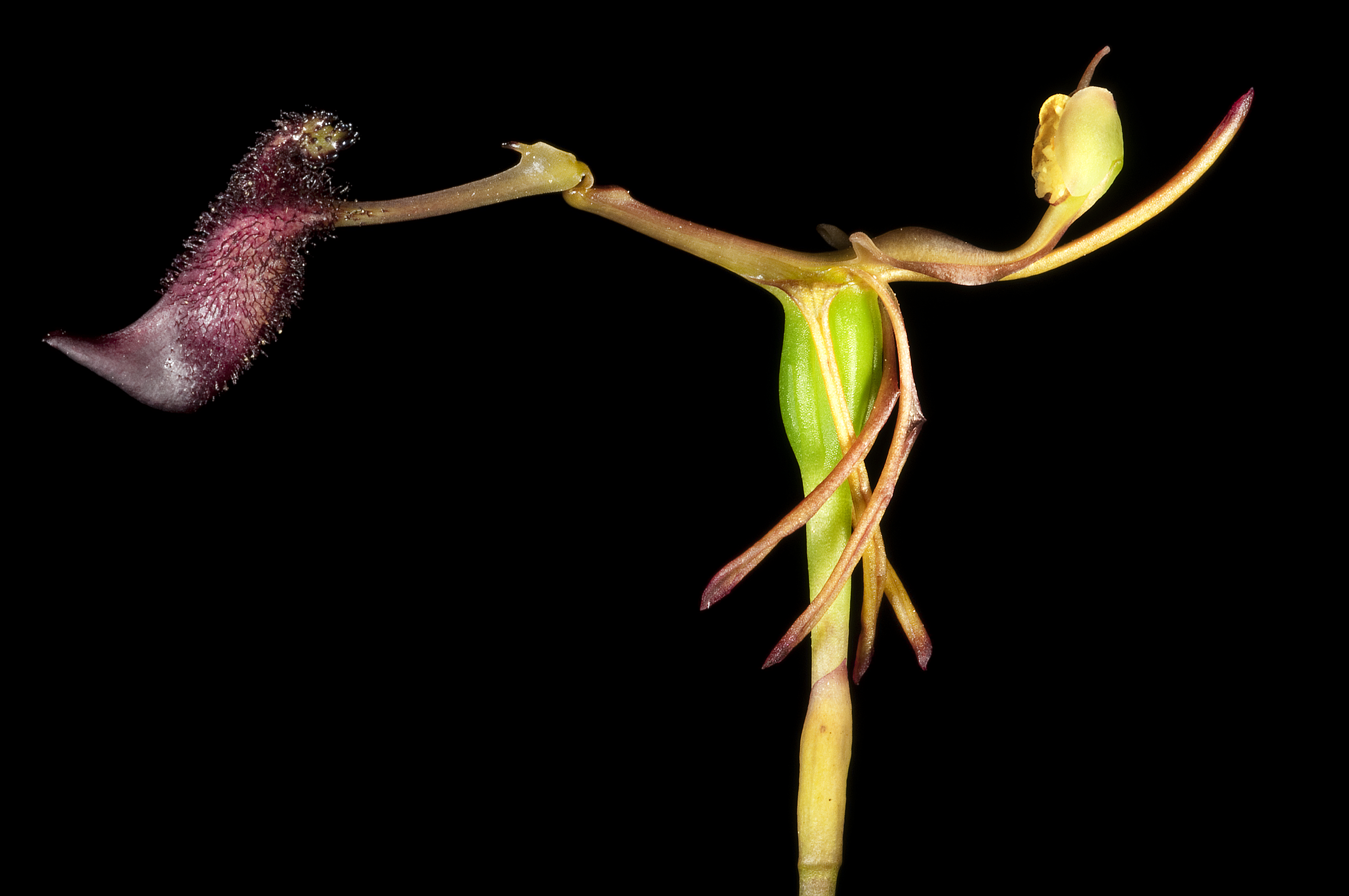

Scientific classification
- Kingdom: Plantae
- Clade: Tracheophytes
- Clade: Angiosperms
- Clade: Monocots
- Order: Asparagales
- Family: Orchidaceae
- Subfamily: Orchidoideae
- Tribe: Diurideae
- Genus: Drakaea
- Species: D. gracilis

Binomial name
- Drakaea gracilis Hopper & A.P.Br. (2007)

= Drakaea gracilis =

Species of orchid endemic to Western Australia

Drakaea gracilis, commonly known as slender hammer orchid, is a species of orchid endemic to the south–west of Western Australia. It is pollinated by a single species of male thynnid wasp using sexual deception. The orchid's labellum is similar in shape and scent to a flightless female thynnid wasp. It was first collected in 1900 but other names were given to it, including Drakaea elastica and D. fitzgeraldii. It was not until 2007 when studies of the drakaeas and their pollinators were carried out, that the present species was recognised as distinct.

== Description ==
Drakaea gracilis is similar to others in the genus in that it has a single, ground hugging leaf and an underground tuber. In this case, the leaf is heart shaped, about 20 millimetres (0.8 in) in diameter, glabrous, dull blue-grey with darker lines radiating from the attachment to the stem. The stem is 10–25 centimetres (4–10 in) long and the stalk of the single flower is 10–12 millimetres (0.4–0.5 in) long.

The flower is also similar to those of other hammer orchids in that the labellum resembles a flightless female thynnid wasp, except that in this species the column is pointed, the labellum lacks spots and the "neck" of the insect-like labellum is thinner than in other drakaeas. The sepal at the back of the flower is 12–15 millimetres (0.5–0.6 in) long and the two at the sides are 11–14 millimetres (0.4–0.6 in). The petals are also 11–14 millimetres (0.4–0.6 in) long. The insect-like labellum has a "head" about one-third long as the "body" and which is mostly hairy. The rest of the labellum (representing the female "body" of the insect) is dark maroon in colour and glabrous. Flowers appear from late August to October.

== Taxonomy and naming ==
Drakaea gracilis was first formally described by Stephen Hopper and Andrew Brown in 2007. Their description was published in Australian Systematic Botany. The specific epithet (gracilis) is from the Latin gracilis meaning "thin or slender", referring to the labellum of this species which is narrower than that of D. livida.

== Distribution and habitat ==
Slender hammer orchid occurs in higher areas from near Dandaragan to the Stirling Range and Margaret River districts. It grows in sandy gravel in woodland.

== Conservation ==
Drakaea gracilis is classified as "not threatened" by the Western Australian Government Department of Parks and Wildlife.
