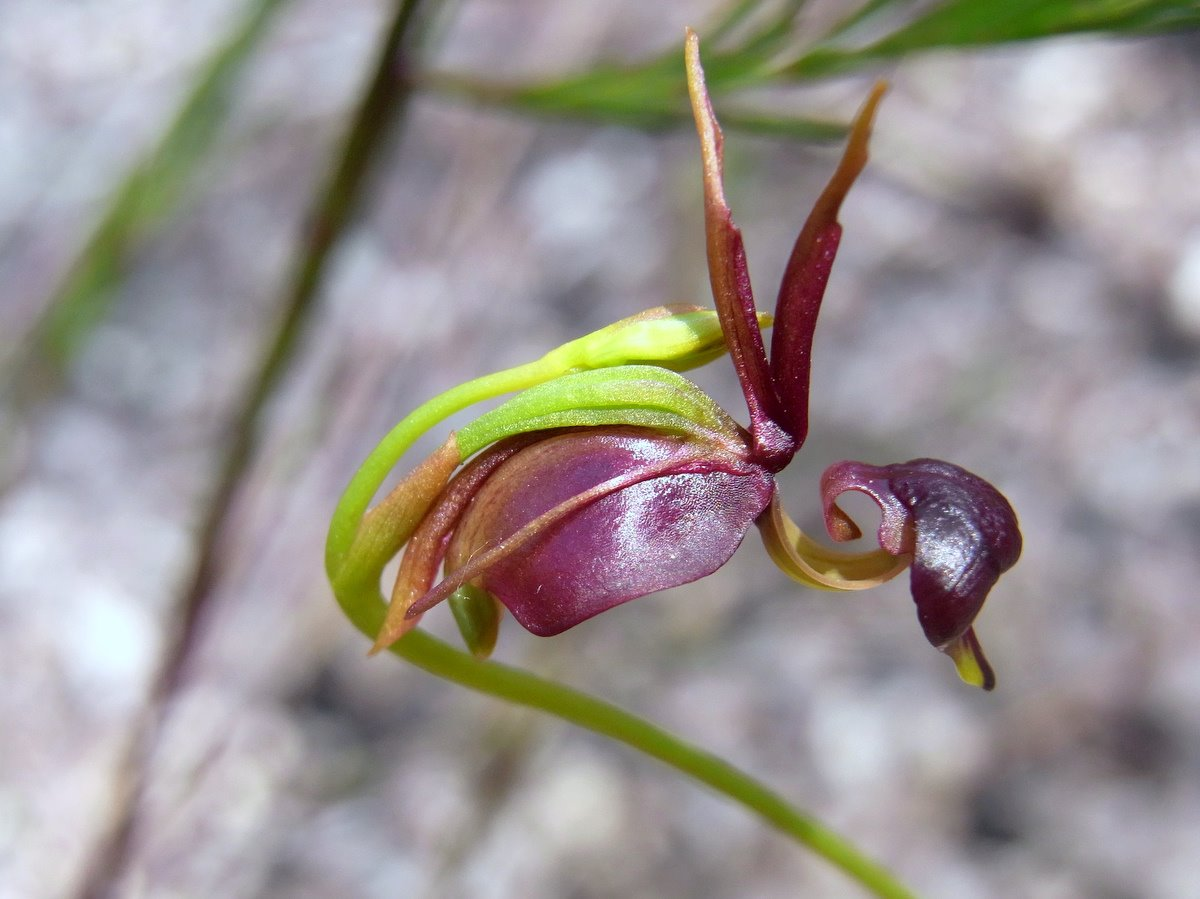
- Large duck orchid (Caleana major)

Scientific classification
- Kingdom: Plantae
- Clade: Tracheophytes
- Clade: Angiosperms
- Clade: Monocots
- Order: Asparagales
- Family: Orchidaceae
- Subfamily: Orchidoideae
- Tribe: Diurideae
- Subtribe: Drakaeinae
- Genus: Caleana; R.Br.

Type species
- Caleana major R.Br.

Synonyms
- Cahya F.Muell. orth. var.; Caleya R.Br. nom. illeg., nom. superfl.; Caleyana T.Post & Kuntze orth. var.; Paracaleana Blaxell; Paracaleana subg. Tanychila D.L.Jones & M.A.Clem.; Sullivania F.Muell.; Sullivania subg. Tanychila (D.L.Jones & M.A.Clem.) D.L.Jones & M.A.Clem.

= Caleana =

Duck orchids

Genus of flowering plants

Caleana, commonly known as duck orchids, is a genus of flowering plants in the orchid family, Orchidaceae that is found in Australia and New Zealand. The Australian species are found in all states but have not been recorded in the Northern Territory. Duck orchids have a single leaf and one or a few, dull-coloured, inconspicuous flowers. Most species are found in Western Australia but one species (C. major) occurs in eastern Australia and one (C. minor) occurs in eastern Australia and New Zealand. Orchids in this genus as well as the hammer orchids (Drakaea) are pollinated by male thynnid wasps.

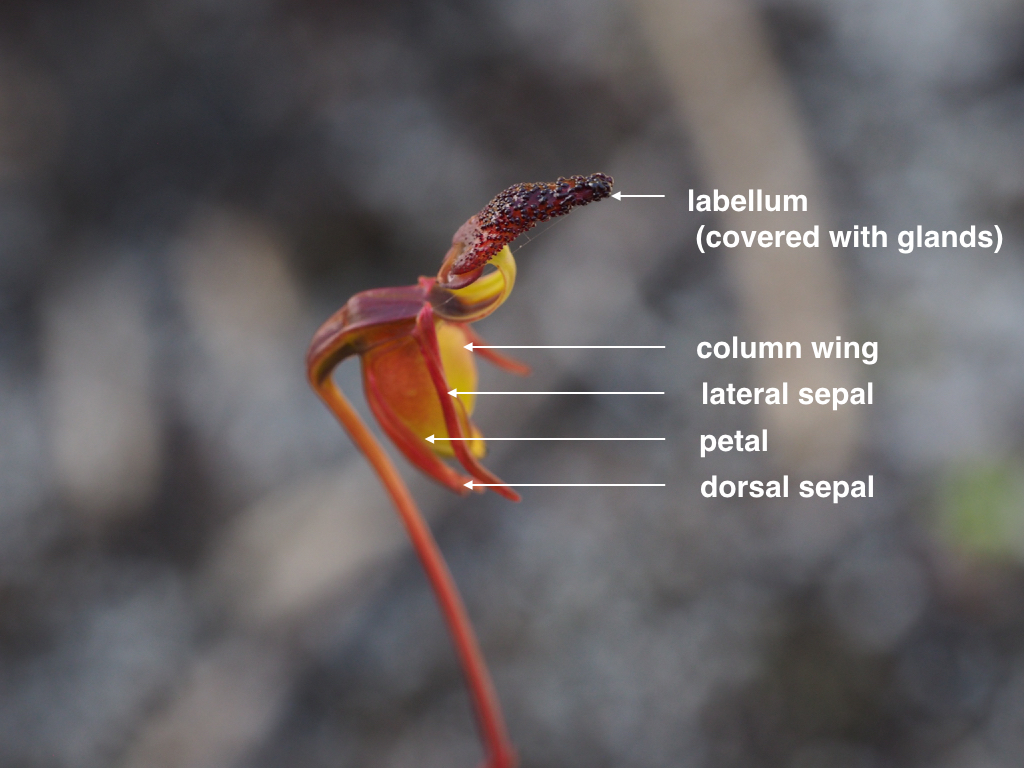
Labelled diagram of Caleana nigrita

== Description ==
Orchids in the genus Caleana are terrestrial, perennial, deciduous, sympodial herbs usually with a few inconspicuous, fine roots and a dark red, oval-shaped, tuber. Replacement tubers called "droppers" form at the end of long root-like stolons. A single linear to egg-shaped leaf 10–40 mm (0.4–2 in) long develops near the base of the plant during the growing season and withers late in the flowering season. The leaf is folded lengthwise and often has purple markings. The flowering stem is wiry, dull brownish maroon and bears one to a few flowers each on a stalk 5–20 mm (0.2–0.8 in) long, each with a small leaf-like bract. The flowers are non-resupinate and glabrous. The dorsal sepal and the two lateral petals are similar in size and are narrow linear in shape with pointed or club-shaped ends. The dorsal sepal points downwards and is pressed against the column. The lateral sepals and two petals usually spread obliquely downwards and sideways. The dorsal sepal and petals are attached to the base of the column where it joins to the ovary. As is usual in orchids, one petal is highly modified as the central labellum. Duck orchids have an unusual, insect-like labellum which is attached to the rest of the flower by a sensitive stalk which holds the labellum above the flower in the "set" position. The labellum is attached to the column by a flexible "claw" which bends under the weight of a pollinating wasp. The column has broad wings and when the labellum is touched, it rapidly turns down, trapping a visiting insect between the labellum and column wings so that the insect comes into contact with the sexual parts of the column. The labellum is flask-shaped, narrowing near the end with the narrow end covered with small raised calli or glands which are usually black, but may be maroon or greenish. In some species the calli may cover a greater part, or even all of the labellum (as in P. minor). Glands on the labellum emit pheromones which are sexual attractants for male thynnid wasps. Flowering occurs in spring in most species and is followed by the fruit which is a non-fleshy, dehiscent capsule containing up to 500 seeds.

== Taxonomy and naming ==
The genus Caleana was first formally described in 1810 by Robert Brown and the description was published in Prodromus Florae Novae Hollandiae et Insulae Van Diemen. The name Caleana honours George Caley.

There has been disagreement about the classification of this genus and its relationship with Paracaleana. In 1989 Mark Clements noted that none of the characters used to separate Paracaleana from Caleana is "sufficiently significant" to maintain two genera. A recent (2014) paper reports that recent molecular studies suggest that Caleana and Paracaleana are congeneric. However, the Western Australian Herbarium and several recent field guides to the orchids of Western Australia accept Paracaleana.

=== Species list ===
The following is a list of the species of Caleana accepted by the Australian Plant Census as at October 2025.

- Caleana alcockii (Hopper & A.P.Br.) M.A.Clem. – Alcock's duck orchid (Western Australia)
- Caleana brockmanii (Hopper & A.P.Br.) M.A.Clem. – Brockman's duck orchid (Western Australia)
- Caleana disjuncta (D.L.Jones) M.A.Clem. – little duck orchid (Western Australia), South Australia, Victoria
- Caleana dixonii (Hopper & A.P.Br.) M.A.Clem. – sandplain duck orchid (Western Australia)
- Caleana gracilicordata (Hopper & A.P.Br.) M.A.Clem. – slender-leafed duck orchid (Western Australia)
- Caleana granitica (Hopper & A.P.Br.) M.A.Clem. – granite duck orchid (Western Australia)
- Caleana hortiorum (Hopper & A.P.Br.) M.A.Clem. – Hort's duck orchid (Western Australia)
- Caleana lyonsii (Hopper & A.P.Br.) M.A.Clem. – midget duck orchid (Western Australia)
- Caleana major R.Br. – large duck orchid (New South Wales, Queensland, South Australia, Tasmania, Victoria)
- Caleana minor R.Br. – small duck orchid (New South Wales, Queensland, South Australia, Tasmania, Victoria, North Island of New Zealand)
- Caleana nigrita J.Drumm. ex Lindl. – flying duck orchid (Western Australia)
- Caleana parvula (Hopper & A.P.Br.) M.A.Clem. – Esperance duck orchid (Western Australia)
- Caleana terminalis (Hopper & A.P.Br.) M.A.Clem. – smooth-billed duck orchid (Western Australia)
- Caleana triens (Hopper & A.P.Br.) M.A.Clem. – broad-billed duck orchid (Western Australia)

== Distribution and habitat ==
The Western Australian duck orchids usually grow in sandy soil near areas that are swampy in winter where they often grow with hare orchids (Leporella), hammer orchids (Drakaea) and beak orchids (Pyrorchis). Caleana major which occurs in eastern Australia and C. minor which is found in both eastern Australia and New Zealand grow in woodland, damp heath shrubland and grassland, sometimes on rocky slopes or in gravelly soil or on road verges.

== Ecology ==
Orchids in the genus Caleana are pollinated by male thynnid wasps which are attracted to the flower by pheromones. When a wasp lands on the labellum, in its attempt to copulate with it, the labellum is flipped downwards against the column. If the flower has not previously been visited, pollinia in the column will adhere to the insect's back. When that insect visits another duck orchid and the process is repeated, the transported pollinia will adhere to the stigma of the second flower and it will be pollinated.
