= Drakaea confluens =

Late hammer orchid

Conservation status
- Endangered (EPBC Act)

Scientific classification
- Kingdom: Plantae
- Clade: Tracheophytes
- Clade: Angiosperms
- Clade: Monocots
- Order: Asparagales
- Family: Orchidaceae
- Subfamily: Orchidoideae
- Tribe: Diurideae
- Genus: Drakaea
- Species: D. confluens

Binomial name
- Drakaea confluens Hopper & A.P.Br.

Species of orchid endemic to Western Australia

Drakaea confluens, commonly known as late hammer orchid, is a species of orchid endemic to the south–west of Western Australia. It is similar to other hammer orchids in that it is pollinated by a single species of male thynnid wasp using sexual deception. The orchid's labellum is similar in shape and scent to a specific species of flightless female thynnid wasp. The species was discovered and collected in 1930 but was not formally described until 2007. It is only known from three areas in the south of the state and has been declared "endangered" by the Australian government and "threatened" by the Government of Western Australia.

== Description ==
Late hammer orchid is similar to others in the genus in that it has a single, ground hugging leaf and an underground tuber. In this case, the leaf is heart shaped, about 20 millimetres (0.8 in) in diameter, dull blue-grey in colour with darker green lines and distinct veins visible on the upper surface. There are also minute raised lumps over its surface. The stem is 15–30 centimetres (6–10 in) long and the stalk of the single flower is 10–12 millimetres (0.4–0.5 in) long.

Its flower is also similar to those of other hammer orchids in that the labellum resembles a flightless female thynnid wasp however it can be distinguished by colouration of the labellum. The "head" and part of the "abdomen" of the insect-like labellum are light green with darker spots while the end of the "abdomen" is a dark maroon colour. The sepal at the back of the flower, the two at the sides and the petals are all 9–11 millimetres (0.35–0.43 in) long. The head-like top of the labellum is distinctly hairy and has two dark-coloured lumps at its base. Flowers appear from September to November, depending to a certain extent on location.

== Taxonomy and naming ==
Drakaea confluens was discovered and first collected near Gnowangerup by Mrs. P. Andrews. There were no other collections until 1982 from Boyup Brook. The species was first formally described by Stephen Hopper and Andrew Brown in 2007. Their description was published in Australian Systematic Botany. The species is "named from the Latin confluens (confluent, running together)" referring to the labellum of this species having a labellum intermediate in form between those of D. livida and D. elastica.

== Distribution and habitat ==
The late hammer orchid is only known from three disjunct populations in the Boyup Brook district, Stirling Range National Park and Porongurup National Park. It grows in sand in shrubland or woodland.

== Conservation ==
The Western Australian Government Department of Parks and Wildlife classifies the species as "threatened" meaning that it is considered likely to become extinct, or rare and in need of special protection. The Australian Government lists its status under the Environmental Protection and Biodiversity Conservation Act as "endangered". The main threats to the species' survival are human activities (such as road maintenance, reactreational activities and development), competition from invasive species (including weeds and feral animals) and dieback disease.
