= Caleana parvula =

Esperance duck orchid

Conservation status
- Priority Two — Poorly Known Taxa (DEC)

Scientific classification
- Kingdom: Plantae
- Clade: Tracheophytes
- Clade: Angiosperms
- Clade: Monocots
- Order: Asparagales
- Family: Orchidaceae
- Subfamily: Orchidoideae
- Tribe: Diurideae
- Genus: Caleana
- Species: C. parvula

Binomial name
- Caleana parvula (Hopper & A.P.Br.) M.A.Clem.

Synonyms
- Paracaleana parvula Hopper & A.P.Br.; Paracaleana sp. (A.P.Brown s.n.); Paracaleana sp. Israelite Bay (W.Jackson 8/11/1995) WA Herbarium; Paracaleana sp. Nuytsland (A.P.Brown s.n.)

Species of flowering plant

Caleana parvula, commonly known as the Esperance duck orchid is a species of orchid endemic to a small area near Esperance in the south-west of Western Australia. It has a single smooth leaf and usually only a single greenish yellow and red flower. It is distinguished by its small flower with the calli only on the outer one-fifth of the labellum. The only other Caleana species in Western Australia which is smaller is C. lyonsii.

== Description ==
Caleana labellum has a single smooth, dull green or dull red leaf, 10–30 mm (0.4–1 in) long, 3–4 mm (0.1–0.2 in) wide and usually withered by flowering time. Usually only one greenish-yellow and red flower, 15–18 mm (0.6–0.7 in) long and 8–12 mm (0.3–0.5 in) wide is borne on a thin, wiry stalk 90–180 mm (4–7 in) high. The dorsal sepal, lateral sepals and petals are narrow and hang downwards with the dorsal sepal pressed against the column which has broad wings, forming a bucket-like shape. About one fifth of the outer part of the labellum is covered with glossy black glands or calli and the labellum flattened. Flowering occurs in October and November.

== Taxonomy and naming ==
The Esperance duck orchid was first formally described in 2006 by Stephen Hopper and Andrew Brown who gave it the name Paracaleana parvula. The description was published in Australian Systematic Botany from a specimen collected in the Cape Arid National Park. In 2014, based on molecular studies, Joseph Miller and Mark Clements transferred all the species previously in Paracaleana to Caleana so that the present species became Caleana parvula. The specific epithet (parvula) is the diminutive form of the Latin word parvus meaning "little" hence "rather little", referring to the small size of the flower compared to others in the genus.

== Distribution and habitat ==
Caleana parvula grows in sandy soil in shrubland between Condingup and Israelite Bay in the Esperance Plains biogeographic region.

== Conservation ==
Caleana parvula (as Paracaleana parvula) is classified as "Priority Two" by the Western Australian Government Department of Parks and Wildlife meaning that it is poorly known and from only one or a few locations.
