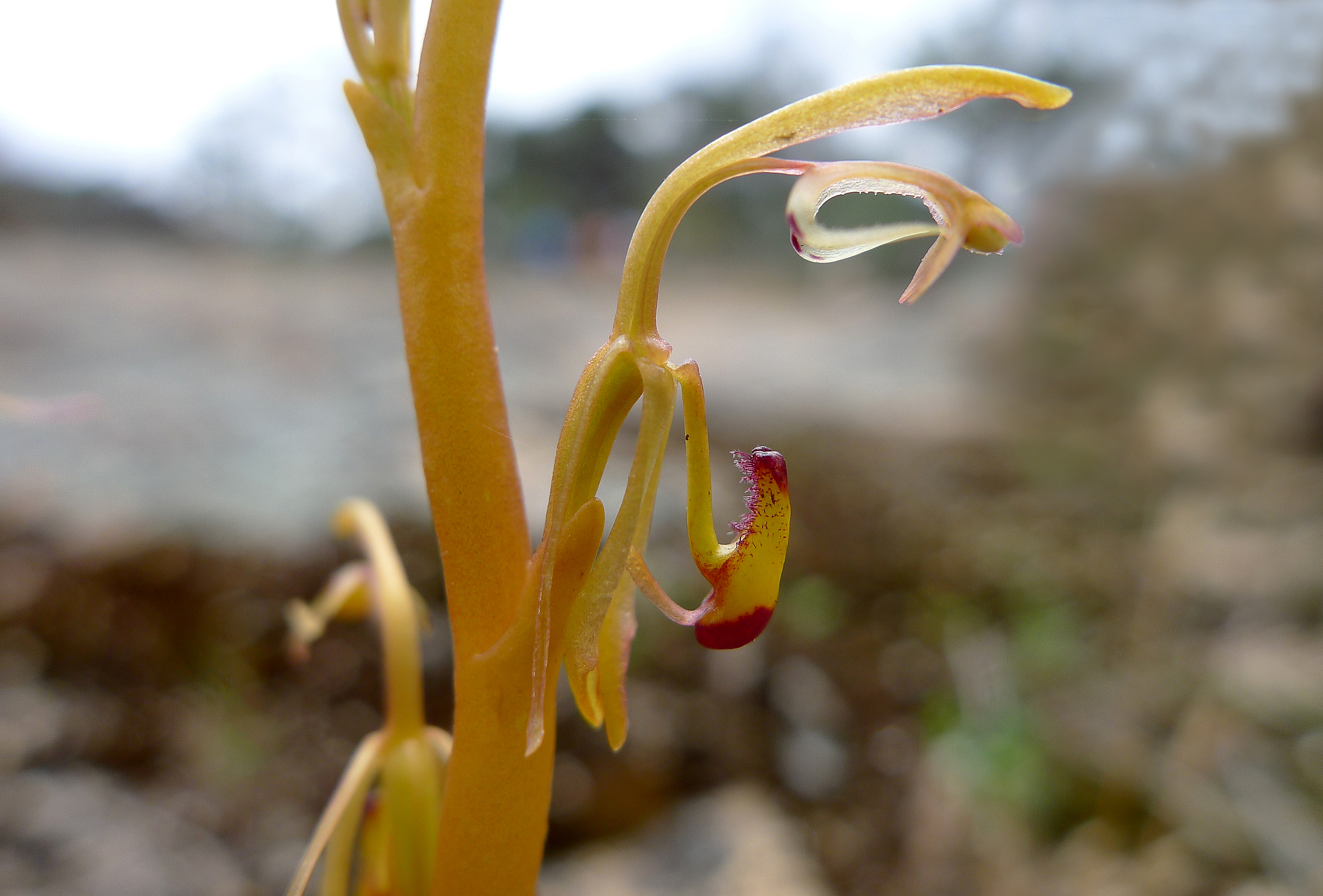
- On Boyagin Rock

Scientific classification
- Kingdom: Plantae
- Clade: Tracheophytes
- Clade: Angiosperms
- Clade: Monocots
- Order: Asparagales
- Family: Orchidaceae
- Subfamily: Orchidoideae
- Tribe: Diurideae
- Subtribe: Drakaeinae
- Genus: Spiculaea; Lindl.
- Species: S. ciliata

Binomial name
- Spiculaea ciliata Lindl.

Synonyms
- Drakaea ciliata (Lindl.) Rchb.f.

= Spiculaea =

Elbow orchid

Genus of orchids

Spiculaea is a genus of plants defined by a single species, Spiculaea ciliata, commonly known as elbow orchid, and allied to the family Orchidaceae. Endemic to the south-west of Western Australia, the species is unusual in a number of respects; it grows in shallow soil on granite rock outcrops, grows and flowers in the hottest months of the year and has a unique method of using thynnid wasps as pollinators.

== Description ==
Spiculaea ciliata is a terrestrial, perennial, deciduous, sympodial herb with a few inconspicuous, fine roots and an oval-shaped tuber lacking a protective sheath. The tuber produces a replacement tuber and daughter tubers on the end of short, root-like stolons. There is a single stalked leaf about 2 cm (0.8 in) long, 1 cm (0.4 in) wide at the base of the plant and purplish on the lower surface. The leaf is fully developed before the first flowers appear but withers before the first flowers open in late October.

There are up to ten resupinate flowers on the end of a wiry stem 10–18 cm (4–7 in) high which is thickest near the top and which gradually withers from the base as the flowers mature. Each flower is straw-coloured, 20 mm (0.8 in) long and 10 mm (0.4 in) wide on a short stalk. The dorsal sepal curves over the top of the flower, with its side edges curved downwards. The two lateral sepals are shorter than the dorsal sepal and the two petals are narrower than both. The petals are sepals are separate from each other. As is usual in orchids, one petal is highly modified as the central labellum. The labellum is shaped like a wingless insect, and is attached to the base of the column by a flexible, hinge-like "claw". The labellum is much smaller than in other orchids and is rod-like, fleshy and has many club-shaped hairs. The sexual parts of the flower are fused to the column, which has wing-like structures on its sides. Flowering occurs from October to January and is followed by a fruit which is a non-fleshy, glabrous, dehiscent capsule containing a large number of seeds.

Labelled image

== Taxonomy and naming ==
This orchid was first formally described in 1840 by John Lindley, his description was published in A Sketch of the Vegetation of the Swan River Colony. In 1871 Heinrich Reichenbach assigned them to an extant genus, Drakaea, publishing the combination Drakaea ciliata. However, in a 1989 revision David Jones and Mark Clements, separated this population from Drakaea and other orchid genera and this reinstated Lindley's original name.

The origin of the genus name, "Spiculaea", is from the Latin word spiculum meaning "a sharp point" or "a sting", probably referring to the appendage at the tip of the labellum. The specific epithet ("ciliata") is from the Latin word meaning "eyelash" or "eyelid", referring to the long hairs found on the sides of the labellum.

== Distribution and habitat ==
Spiculaea ciliata grows in shallow, sandy soil over granite between the Darling Scarp, Paynes Find and Mount Ney in the Avon Wheatbelt, Coolgardie, Esperance Plains, Geraldton Sandplains, Jarrah Forest and Mallee biogeographic regions.

== Ecology ==
The flowers of elbow orchid have been described as "bizarre" and the production of flowers during the hottest months is unusual. One author described: "When most other plants dead or dying, this tiny orchid at its fascinating best. When everything else was brittle underfoot these are still succulent. A specimen continued to flower in my collection in the fridge after I got home, weeks later. (Nikulinsky)"

Spiculaea ciliata is thought to be pollinated by a male thynnid wasp of the genus Thynnoturneria which is initially attracted to the labellum of the orchid by a pheromone, flying from downwind towards the flower. At rest, the labellum resembles a wingless female wasp, resting on a blade of grass. The insect picks up the dummy female and tries to fly off with it, rising into the column where the column wings hold the insect, and its abdomen comes into contact with the sexual parts of the flower.

== Conservation ==
The species is classified as "not threatened" by the Western Australian Government Department of Parks and Wildlife.
