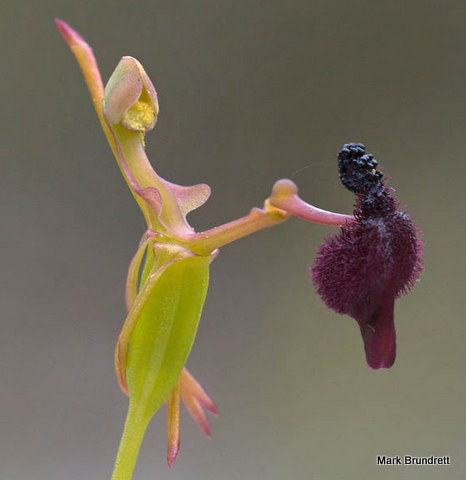
- Drakaea glyptodon (English: King-in-his-carriage - hammer orchid)

Scientific classification
- Kingdom: Plantae
- Clade: Tracheophytes
- Clade: Angiosperms
- Clade: Monocots
- Order: Asparagales
- Family: Orchidaceae
- Subfamily: Orchidoideae
- Tribe: Diurideae
- Subtribe: Drakaeinae; Schltr. Bot. Jahrb. Syst. 45: 381 (1911)

Genera
- Arthrochilus; Caleana; Chiloglottis; Drakaea; Paracaleana; Spiculaea

= Drakaeinae =

Subtribe of orchids

Drakaneinae is an orchid subtribe in the tribe Diurideae.
