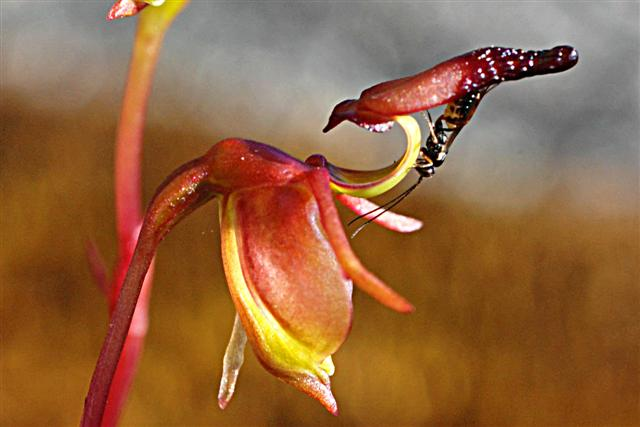

Conservation status
- Priority One — Poorly Known Taxa (DEC)

Scientific classification
- Kingdom: Plantae
- Clade: Tracheophytes
- Clade: Angiosperms
- Clade: Monocots
- Order: Asparagales
- Family: Orchidaceae
- Subfamily: Orchidoideae
- Tribe: Diurideae
- Genus: Caleana
- Species: C. gracilicordata

Binomial name
- Caleana gracilicordata (Hopper & A.P.Br.) M.A.Clem.

Synonyms
- Paracaleana gracilicordata Hopper & A.P.Br.

= Caleana gracilicordata =

Slender-leafed duck orchid

Species of flowering plant

Caleana gracilicordata, commonly known as slender-leafed duck orchid is a species of orchid endemic to the south-west of Western Australia. It is a small, late flowering duck orchid with a single small, smooth, heart-shaped leaf and a single greenish yellow and red flower. It usually grows in mossy places on granite outcrops.

== Description ==
Caleana gracilicordata has a single smooth, narrow heart-shaped, dull green to dull red leaf, 15–20 mm (0.6–0.8 in) long and 3–4 mm (0.1–0.2 in) wide. The leaf is usually withered by flowering time. Usually only one greenish-yellow and red flower, about 20 mm (0.8 in) long and 15–20 mm (0.6–0.8 in) wide is borne on a flowering stem 55–70 mm (2–3 in) high. The dorsal sepal, lateral sepals and petals are narrow and hang downwards with the dorsal sepal pressed against the column which has broad wings, forming a bucket-like shape. About one-half to one-third of the outer part of the labellum is covered with glossy black glands or calli and the labellum has a flattened top. Flowering occurs from late October to November.

== Taxonomy and naming ==
The slender-leafed duck orchid was first formally described in 2006 by Stephen Hopper and Andrew Brown who gave it the name Paracaleana gracilicordata. The description was published in Australian Systematic Botany from a specimen collected near Jarrahdale. In 2014, based on molecular studies, Joseph Miller and Mark Clements transferred all the species previously in Paracaleana to Caleana so that the present species became Caleana gracilicordata. The specific epithet (gracilicordata) is derived from the Latin words gracilis meaning "slender" or "gracile" and cordata meaning "heart-shaped", referring to the shape of the leaf of this orchid.

== Distribution and habitat ==
Caleana gracilicordata grows with mosses and lichens on granite outcrops between Waroona and the Brookton Highway in the Jarrah Forest biogeographic region.

== Conservation ==
Caleana gracilicordata (as Paracaleana gracilicordata) is classified as "Priority One" by the Government of Western Australia Department of Parks and Wildlife, meaning that it is known from only one or a few locations which are potentially at risk.
