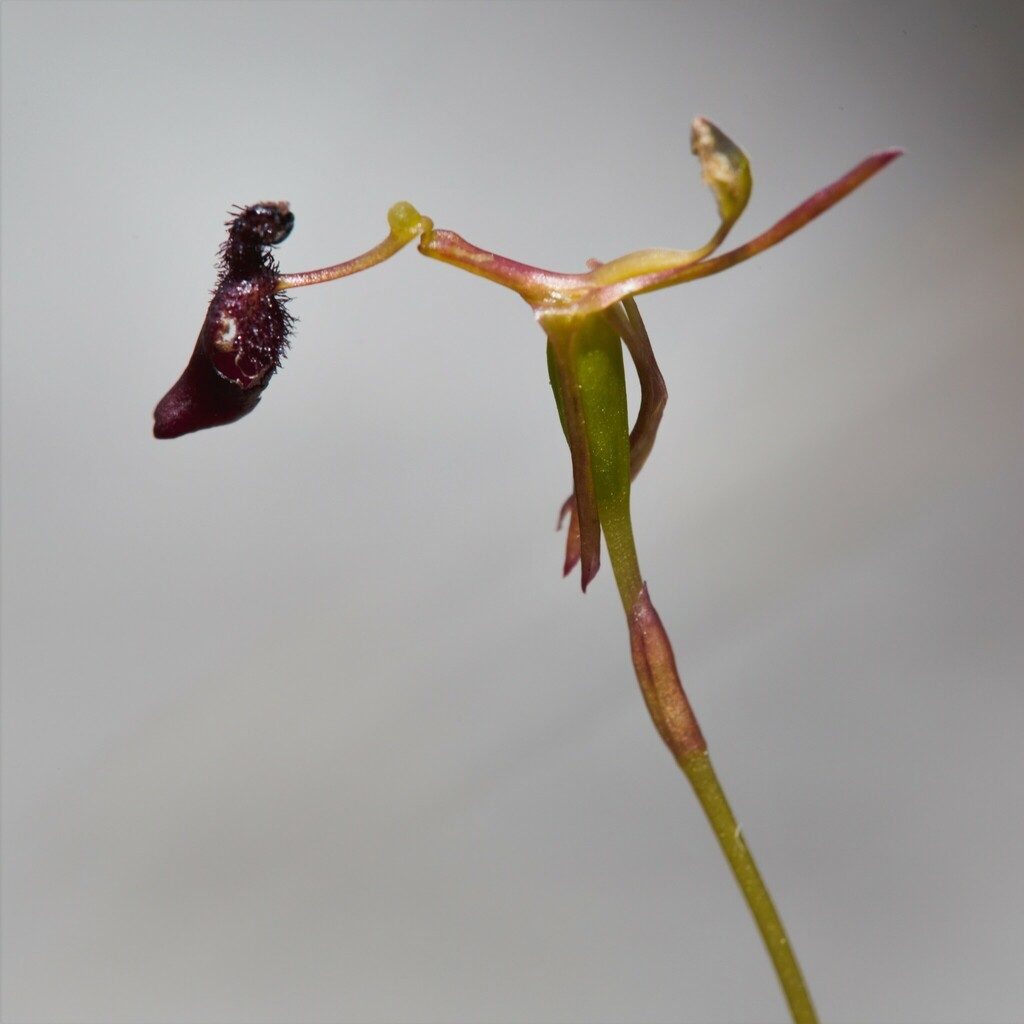

Conservation status
- Vulnerable (EPBC Act)

Scientific classification
- Kingdom: Plantae
- Clade: Embryophytes
- Clade: Tracheophytes
- Clade: Angiosperms
- Clade: Monocots
- Order: Asparagales
- Family: Orchidaceae
- Subfamily: Orchidoideae
- Tribe: Diurideae
- Genus: Drakaea
- Species: D. micrantha

Binomial name
- Drakaea micrantha Hopper & A.P.Br. (2007)

= Drakaea micrantha =

Dwarf hammer orchid

Species of orchid endemic to Western Australia

Drakaea micrantha, commonly known as dwarf hammer orchid, is a species of orchid endemic to the south–west of Western Australia. It is similar to other hammer orchids in that it is pollinated by a single species of male thynnid wasp using sexual deception. The orchid's labellum is similar in shape and scent to a flightless female thynnid wasp. It has a single silvery-grey, heart-shaped leaf with prominent green veins and a stem up to 30 centimetres (12 in) long. The species is only known from a scattered populations in the south west of the state and has been declared "vulnerable" by the Australian government and "threatened" by the government of Western Australia.

== Description ==
Drakaea micrantha is similar to others in the genus in that it has a single, ground hugging leaf and an underground tuber. In this case, the leaf is heart shaped, about 10 millimetres (0.4 in) in diameter, silvery-grey dark green and rather glossy with darker green veins radiating from the leaf attachment. The stem is 15–30 centimetres (6–10 in) long and the stalk of the single flower is 10–15 millimetres (0.4–0.6 in) long.

Its flower is also similar to those of other hammer orchids in that the labellum resembles a flightless female thynnid wasp however it can be distinguished by having a spine on the column, and a labellum with a straight end and a narrow "neck". The sepal at the back of the flower is 7–10 millimetres (0.3–0.4 in) long and the two at the sides are 6–9 millimetres (0.2–0.4 in). The petals are also 6–9 millimetres (0.2–0.4 in) long. The insect-like labellum has a head about half as long as the body and is hairy for at least half its length. The "body" of the labellum is dark-coloured, slightly swollen and has a few hairs. Flowers appear in September and October.

== Taxonomy and naming ==
Drakaea micrantha was first formally described by Stephen Hopper and Andrew Brown in 2007. Their description was published in Australian Systematic Botany. The specific epithet (micrantha) is derived from the Ancient Greek μικρός (mikrós) meaning "small" or "little" and ἄνθος (ánthos) meaning "flower", referring to the flower of this species being the smallest of the genus.

== Distribution and habitat ==
Dwarf hammer orchid occurs at Perth, Augusta and Porongurup National Park. It grows in bare sand in woodland, often near Kunzea glabrescens thickets.

== Conservation ==
Drakaea micrantha is known from 32 small, scattered populations and the total population of mature plants was estimated in 2007 to be about 514. The Western Australian Government Department of Parks and Wildlife classifies the species as "threatened" meaning that it is considered likely to become extinct, or rare and in need of special protection. The Australian Government lists its status under the Environmental Protection and Biodiversity Conservation Act as "vulnerable". The main threat to the species' survival is fire during its growing and flowering stages between June and early October.
