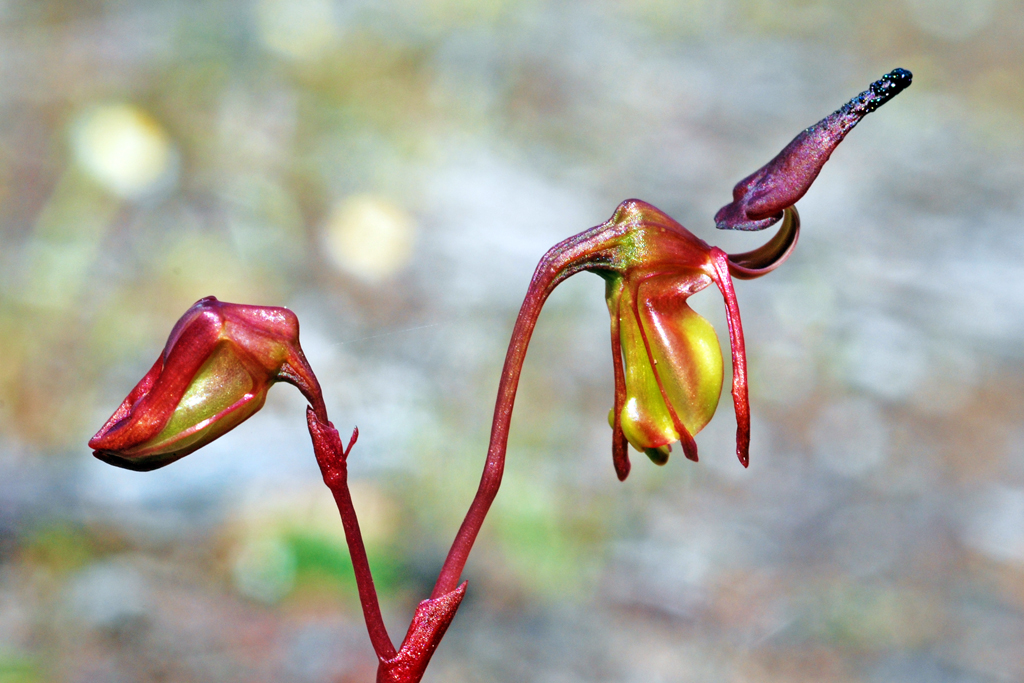

Scientific classification
- Kingdom: Plantae
- Clade: Tracheophytes
- Clade: Angiosperms
- Clade: Monocots
- Order: Asparagales
- Family: Orchidaceae
- Subfamily: Orchidoideae
- Tribe: Diurideae
- Genus: Caleana
- Species: C. hortiorum

Binomial name
- Caleana hortiorum (Hopper & A.P.Br.) M.A.Clem.

Synonyms
- Paracaleana hortiorum Hopper & A.P.Br.

= Caleana hortiorum =

Hort's duck orchid

Species of flowering plant

Caleana hortiorum, commonly known as Hort's duck orchid is a species of orchid endemic to the south-west of Western Australia. It has a single smooth leaf, a single greenish yellow and red flower and is distinguished by its long, narrow, slightly humped labellum, with calli on its outer half. It is found between Perth and Albany.

== Description ==
Caleana hortiorum has a single smooth, dull green or dull red leaf, 10–20 mm (0.4–0.8 in) long and 4–8 mm (0.2–0.3 in) wide. Unlike those of most other species of the genus Caleana, the leaf is not withered at flowering time. Usually only one greenish-yellow and red flower, 10–12 mm (0.4–0.5 in) long and 6–8 mm (0.2–0.3 in) wide is borne on a thin, wiry stalk 70–110 mm (3–4 in) high. The dorsal sepal, lateral sepals and petals are narrow and hang downwards with the dorsal sepal pressed against the column which has broad wings, forming a bucket-like shape. About one half of the outer part of the labellum is covered with glossy black glands or calli and the labellum has a slightly humped top. Flowering occurs in September and October.

== Taxonomy and naming ==
Hort's duck orchid was first formally described in 2006 by Stephen Hopper and Andrew Brown who gave it the name Paracaleana hortiorum. The description was published in Australian Systematic Botany from a specimen collected near York. In 2014, based on molecular studies, Joseph Miller and Mark Clements transferred all the species previously in Paracaleana to Caleana so that the present species became Caleana hortiorum. The specific epithet (hortiorum) honours Fred and Jean Hort who were early collectors of this species.

== Distribution and habitat ==
Caleana hortiorum grows in clearings in shrubland and woodland between Perth and Albany in the Esperance Plains, Jarrah Forest and Swan Coastal Plain biogeographic regions.

== Conservation ==
Caleana hortiorum (as Paracaleana hortiorum) is classified as "not threatened" by the Western Australian Government Department of Parks and Wildlife.
