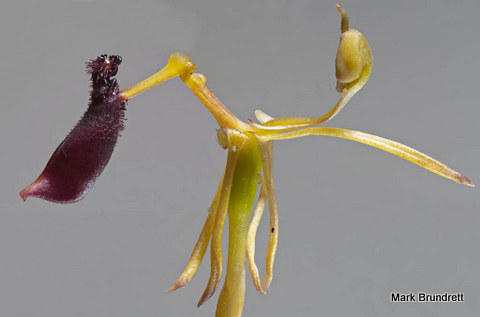

Scientific classification
- Kingdom: Plantae
- Clade: Tracheophytes
- Clade: Angiosperms
- Clade: Monocots
- Order: Asparagales
- Family: Orchidaceae
- Subfamily: Orchidoideae
- Tribe: Diurideae
- Genus: Drakaea
- Species: D. thynniphila

Binomial name
- Drakaea thynniphila A.S.George (1984)

= Drakaea thynniphila =

Species of orchid endemic to Western Australia

Drakaea thynniphila, commonly known as narrow-lipped hammer orchid is a species of orchid endemic to the south–west of Western Australia. It is pollinated by a single species of male thynnid wasp using sexual deception. The orchid's labellum is similar in shape and scent to a flightless female thynnid wasp. It is one of the more common drakaeas and is easily distinguished from the other species. The tiny lumps on its leaf along with the long flower that lacks a swollen labellum are diagnostic.

== Description ==
Drakaea thynniphila is similar to others in the genus in that it has a single, ground hugging leaf and an underground tuber. In this case, the leaf is heart shaped, about 25 millimetres (1 in) in diameter, covered with tiny raised lumps, fairly glossy dark green with darker lines radiating from the attachment to the stem. The stem is 25–40 centimetres (10–20 in) long and the stalk of the single flower is 12–16 millimetres (0.5–0.6 in) long.

Its flower is also similar to those of other hammer orchids in that the labellum resembles a flightless female thynnid wasp, except that the labellum is longer, less swollen than those of other drakaeas and lacks spots. Narrow-lipped hammer orchids have a spine on the column. The sepal at the back of the flower is 12–14 millimetres (0.5–0.6 in) long and the two at the sides are 10–12 millimetres (0.4–0.5 in). The petals are also 10–12 millimetres (0.4–0.5 in) long. The insect-like labellum has a "head" about one-half to one-third long as the "body", is densely hairy and has two dark maroon lumps at its base. The rest of the labellum (representing the female "body" of the insect) is dark maroon in colour, has scattered hairs and the tip of the "abdomen" is in line with the rest of the labellum. Flowers appear from September to late November.

== Taxonomy and naming ==
Drakaea thynniphila was first formally described by Alex George in 1984 in Nuytsia. The specific epithet (thynniphila) is derived from the thynnid wasp and the Ancient Greek word φίλος (phílos) meaning “dear" or, "beloved”.

== Distribution and habitat ==
Narrow-lipped hammer orchid occurs from near Busselton to Albany. It grows in sand in open clearings in woodland and forest.

== Conservation ==
Drakaea thynniphila is classified as "not threatened" by the Western Australian Government Department of Parks and Wildlife.
