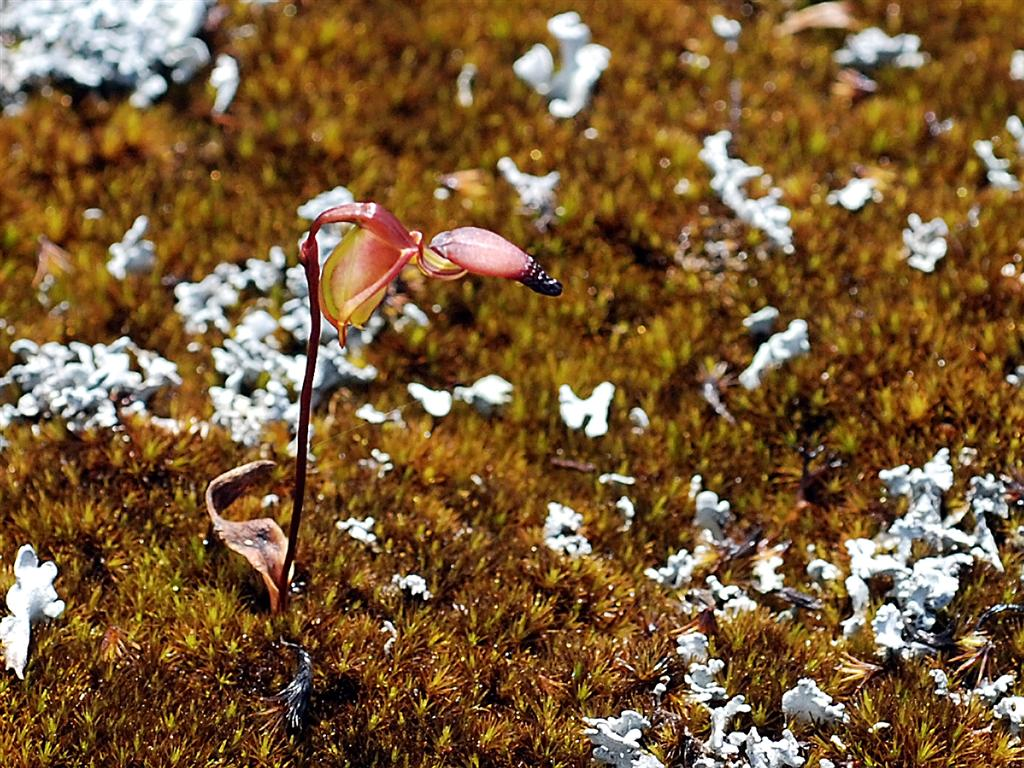

Conservation status
- Priority One — Poorly Known Taxa (DEC)

Scientific classification
- Kingdom: Plantae
- Clade: Tracheophytes
- Clade: Angiosperms
- Clade: Monocots
- Order: Asparagales
- Family: Orchidaceae
- Subfamily: Orchidoideae
- Tribe: Diurideae
- Genus: Caleana
- Species: C. granitica

Binomial name
- Caleana granitica (Hopper & A.P.Br.) M.A.Clem.

Synonyms
- Paracaleana granitica Hopper & A.P.Br.

= Caleana granitica =

Granite duck orchid

Species of flowering plant

Caleana granitica, commonly known as the granite duck orchid is a species of orchid that is endemic to the south-west of Western Australia. It is a species of duck orchid with a single smooth leaf and a single greenish yellow and red flower with the labellum held below the horizontal. It grows on a single granite outcrop near Armadale.

== Description ==
Caleana granitica has a single smooth, dull green to dull red leaf, 10–20 mm (0.4–0.8 in) long and 2–4 mm (0.08–0.2 in) wide. The leaf is usually withered by flowering time. Usually only one greenish-yellow and red flower, 20–25 mm (0.8–1 in) long and 10–12 mm (0.4–0.5 in) wide is borne on a flowering stem 40–70 mm (2–3 in) high. The dorsal sepal, lateral sepals and petals are narrow and hang downwards with the dorsal sepal pressed against the column which has broad wings, forming a bucket-like shape. The labellum has a flattened top and is held below horizontal with one-half to one-third of its outer part covered with glossy black glands or calli. Flowering occurs from October to early December.

== Taxonomy and naming ==
The granite duck orchid was first formally described in 2006 by Stephen Hopper and Andrew Brown who gave it the name Paracaleana granitica and published the description in Australian Systematic Botany. In 2014, based on molecular studies, Joseph Miller and Mark Clements transferred all the species previously in Paracaleana to Caleana so that the present species became Caleana granitica. The specific epithet (granitica) refers to the granite outcrop where this orchid grows.

== Distribution and habitat ==
Caleana granitica grows with mosses and lichens on a granite outcrop south of Armadale in the Jarrah Forest biogeographic region.

== Conservation ==
Caleana granitica (as Paracaleana granitica) is classified as "Priority One" by the Government of Western Australia Department of Parks and Wildlife, meaning that it is known from only one or a few locations which are potentially at risk.
