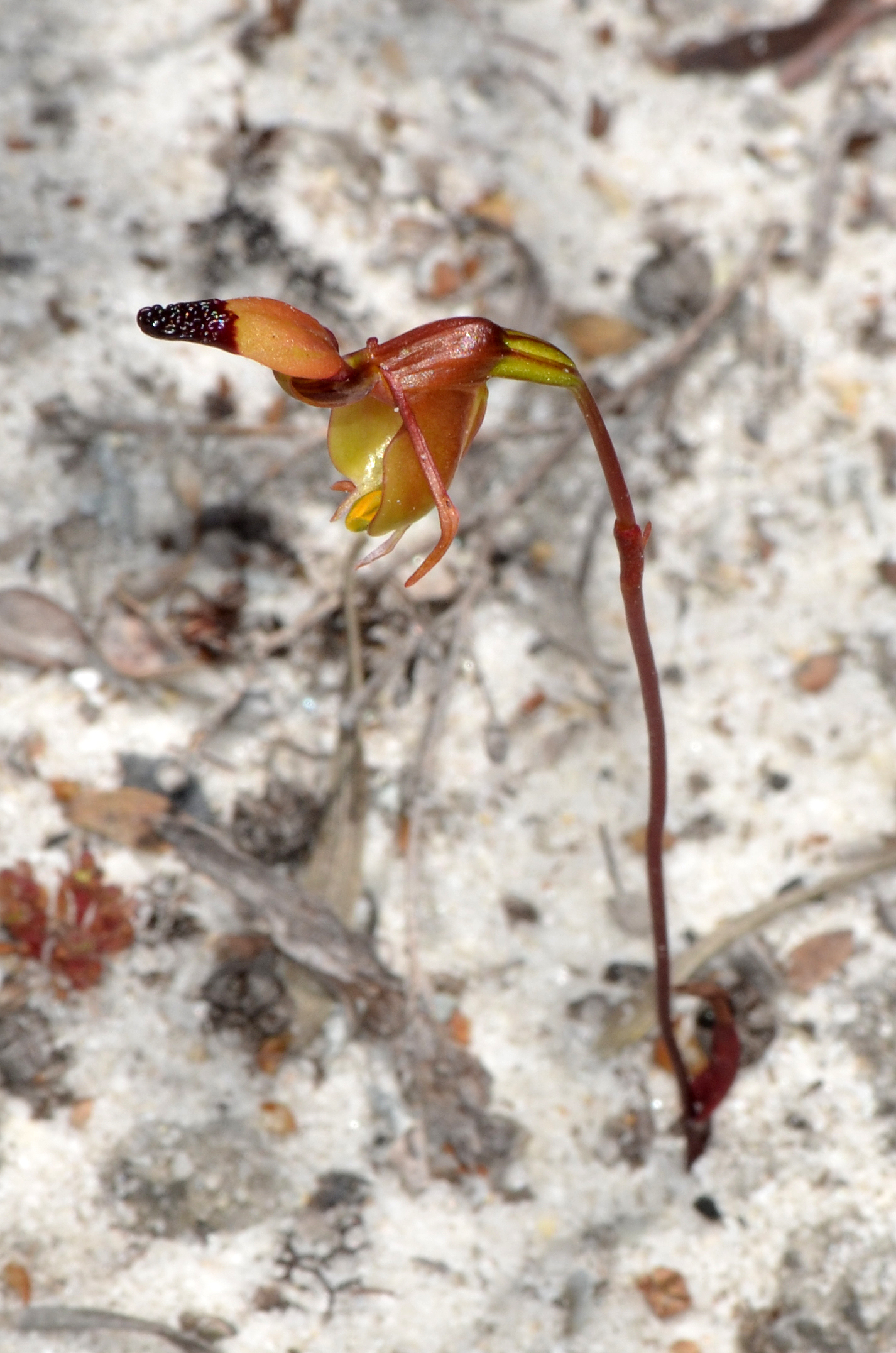

Scientific classification
- Kingdom: Plantae
- Clade: Tracheophytes
- Clade: Angiosperms
- Clade: Monocots
- Order: Asparagales
- Family: Orchidaceae
- Subfamily: Orchidoideae
- Tribe: Diurideae
- Genus: Caleana
- Species: C. brockmanii

Binomial name
- Caleana brockmanii (Hopper & A.P.Br.) M.A.Clem.

Synonyms
- Paracaleana brockmanii Hopper & A.P.Br.

= Caleana brockmanii =

Brockman's duck orchid

Species of flowering plant

Caleana brockmanii, commonly known as Brockman's duck orchid is a species of orchid endemic to the south-west of Western Australia. It has a single smooth leaf, a single greenish yellow and red flower and is distinguished by its flat labellum, relatively late flowering period and calli only near the tip of the labellum. It is found south from Perth.

== Description ==
Caleana brockmanii has a single smooth, dull green or dull red leaf, 15–30 mm (0.6–1 in) long and 3–6 mm (0.1–0.2 in) wide. The leaf is usually withered by flowering time. Usually only one greenish-yellow and red flower, 25–30 mm (0.98–1.2 in) long and 10–12 mm (0.4–0.5 in) wide is borne on a thin, wiry stalk 60–120 mm (2–5 in) high. The dorsal sepal, lateral sepals and petals are narrow and hang downwards with the dorsal sepal pressed against the column which has broad wings, forming a bucket-like shape. About one-third of the outer part of the labellum is covered with glossy black glands or calli and the labellum has a flattened top. Flowering occurs from late October to January.

== Taxonomy and naming ==
Brockman's duck orchid was first formally described in 2006 by Stephen Hopper and Andrew Brown who gave it the name Paracaleana brockmanii. The description was published in Australian Systematic Botany. In 2014, based on molecular studies, Joseph Miller and Mark Clements transferred all the species previously in Paracaleana to Caleana so that the present species became Caleana brockmanii. The specific epithet (brockmanii) honours the amateur orchidologist, Garry Brockman who collected the type specimen.

== Distribution and habitat ==
Caleana brockmanii grows in forest between Perth and Albany in the Jarrah Forest and Warren biogeographic regions.

== Conservation ==
Caleana brockmanii (as Paracaleana brockmanii) is classified as "not threatened" by the Western Australian Government Department of Parks and Wildlife.
