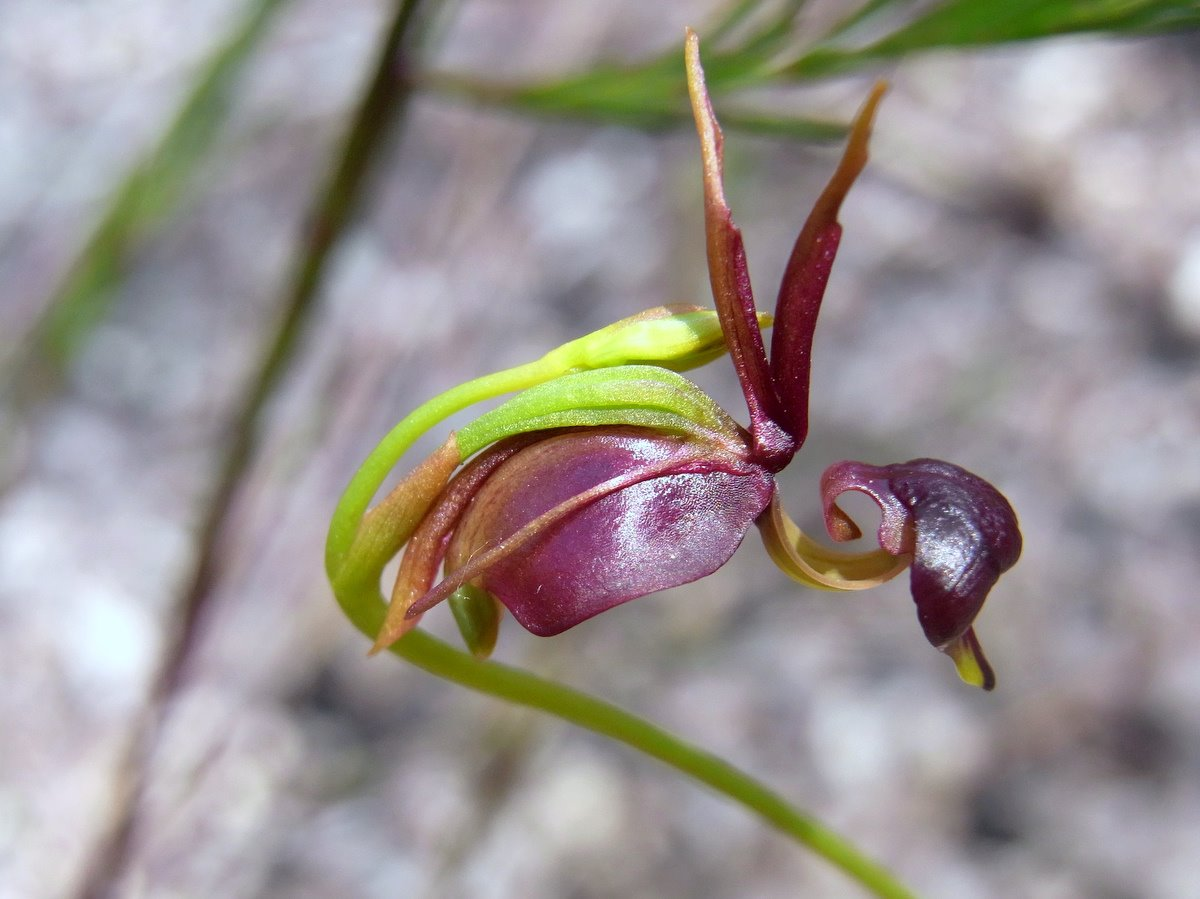

Scientific classification
- Kingdom: Plantae
- Clade: Tracheophytes
- Clade: Angiosperms
- Clade: Monocots
- Order: Asparagales
- Family: Orchidaceae
- Subfamily: Orchidoideae
- Tribe: Diurideae
- Genus: Caleana
- Species: C. major

Binomial name
- Caleana major R.Br.

Synonyms
- Caleya major (R.Br.) R.Br.

= Caleana major =

Flying duck orchid

Species of flowering plant

Caleana major, commonly known as the large duck orchid, is a small orchid found in eastern and southern Australia. This terrestrial plant features a remarkable flower, resembling a duck in flight. The flower is an attractant to insects, such as male sawflies, which pollinate the flower in a process known as pseudocopulation. In 1986, this orchid was featured on an Australian postage stamp.

Caleana major is the emblem of the Latrobe Valley Field Naturalists Club.

== Description ==
Caleana major is a tuberous, perennial herb, usually growing to a height of 200–400 mm (8–20 in) with a single reddish, narrowly lance-shaped leaf, 40–130 mm (2–5 in) long, 4–8 mm (0.2–0.3 in) wide and often spotted, emerging at its base. Up to five shiny reddish brown flowers, 20–25 mm (0.8–1 in) long and 6–7 mm (0.2–0.3 in) wide are borne on a thin, wiry flowering stem. (In rare cases, the flower can be greenish with dark spots.) The sepals and petals are 12–15 mm (0.5–0.6 in) long and have pointed tips. The column has broad wings which the dorsal sepal and petals almost touch and the lateral sepals turn back wing-like behind the flower. The labellum is 6–8 mm (0.2–0.3 in) long and 5–6 mm (0.20–0.24 in) wide and resembles the head of a duck on a strap-like "neck". Flowering occurs from September to January.

== Taxonomy and naming ==
Caleana major was first formally described in 1810 by Robert Brown from a specimen he collected at Port Jackson, Bennelong Point in September 1803. The description was published in Prodromus Florae Novae Hollandiae et Insulae Van Diemen. The genus name (Caleana) honours George Caley, an early botanical collector and the specific epithet (major) is a Latin word meaning "large" or "great".

== Distribution and habitat ==
The flying duck orchid occurs in Queensland, New South Wales, Victoria, South Australia and Tasmania, growing in eucalyptus woodland, coastal or swampy shrubland and heathland. It mostly grows near the coast, occasionally at higher altitudes.

== Ecology ==
The plant is pollinated by insects. The labellum is held above the flower by a sensitive strap-like stalk. When touched, the labellum turns rapidly downward, trapping a visiting insect between the labellum and column wings.

== Cultivation ==
Caleana major has been difficult to maintain in cultivation. Plants flower for one or sometimes two years, but progressively weaken until they die.
