= Caleana disjuncta =

Little duck orchid

Scientific classification
- Kingdom: Plantae
- Clade: Tracheophytes
- Clade: Angiosperms
- Clade: Monocots
- Order: Asparagales
- Family: Orchidaceae
- Subfamily: Orchidoideae
- Tribe: Diurideae
- Genus: Caleana
- Species: C. disjuncta

Binomial name
- Caleana disjuncta (D.L.Jones) M.A.Clem.

Synonyms
- Paracaleana disjuncta D.L.Jones; Sullivania disjuncta (D.L.Jones) & M.A.Clem.

Species of flowering plant

Caleana disjuncta, commonly known as the little duck orchid, is a species of orchid that is found in Western Australia but with a few disjunct populations in Victoria and South Australia. It has a single smooth leaf and a single greenish yellow and red flower with a flattened labellum, the calli only near its tip.

== Description ==
Caleana disjuncta has a single smooth, dull green or dull red leaf, 10–20 mm (0.4–0.8 in) long and 3–10 mm (0.1–0.4 in) wide. Usually only one greenish yellow and red flower, 12–18 mm (0.5–0.7 in) long and 8–12 mm (0.3–0.5 in) wide is borne on a thin, wiry stalk 50–130 mm (2–5 in) high. The dorsal sepal, lateral sepals and petals are 7–10 mm (0.3–0.4 in) long, 1–2 mm (0.04–0.08 in) wide and hang downwards. The dorsal sepal is pressed against the column which has broad wings, forming a bucket-like shape. The labellum is about 10 mm (0.4 in) long on the end of a strap-like stalk about 5 mm (0.2 in) long. The labellum is flattened and only about one-third of the outer part of the labellum is covered with glossy black glands or calli. Flowering occurs from October to December.

== Taxonomy and naming ==
The little duck orchid was first formally described in 2003 by David Jones from a specimen collected in the Cox Scrub Conservation Park. Jones gave it the name Paracaleana disjuncta and published the description in The Orchadian. A 2014 paper reported that molecular studies had suggested that Caleana and Paracaleana are congeneric, so the present species was renamed Caleana disjuncta. The Western Australian Herbarium and several recent field guides to the orchids of Western Australia retain the name Paracaleana disjuncta. The specific epithet (disjuncta) is a Latin word meaning "separate", "distinct", "different" or "remote", referring to the widely separated populations of this orchid.

== Distribution and habitat ==
Caleana disjuncta mainly grows in shrubland between Margaret River and Israelite Bay in Western Australia but there are small populations at three locations in the south-east of South Australia and two in Victoria in and near the Grampians National Park.
