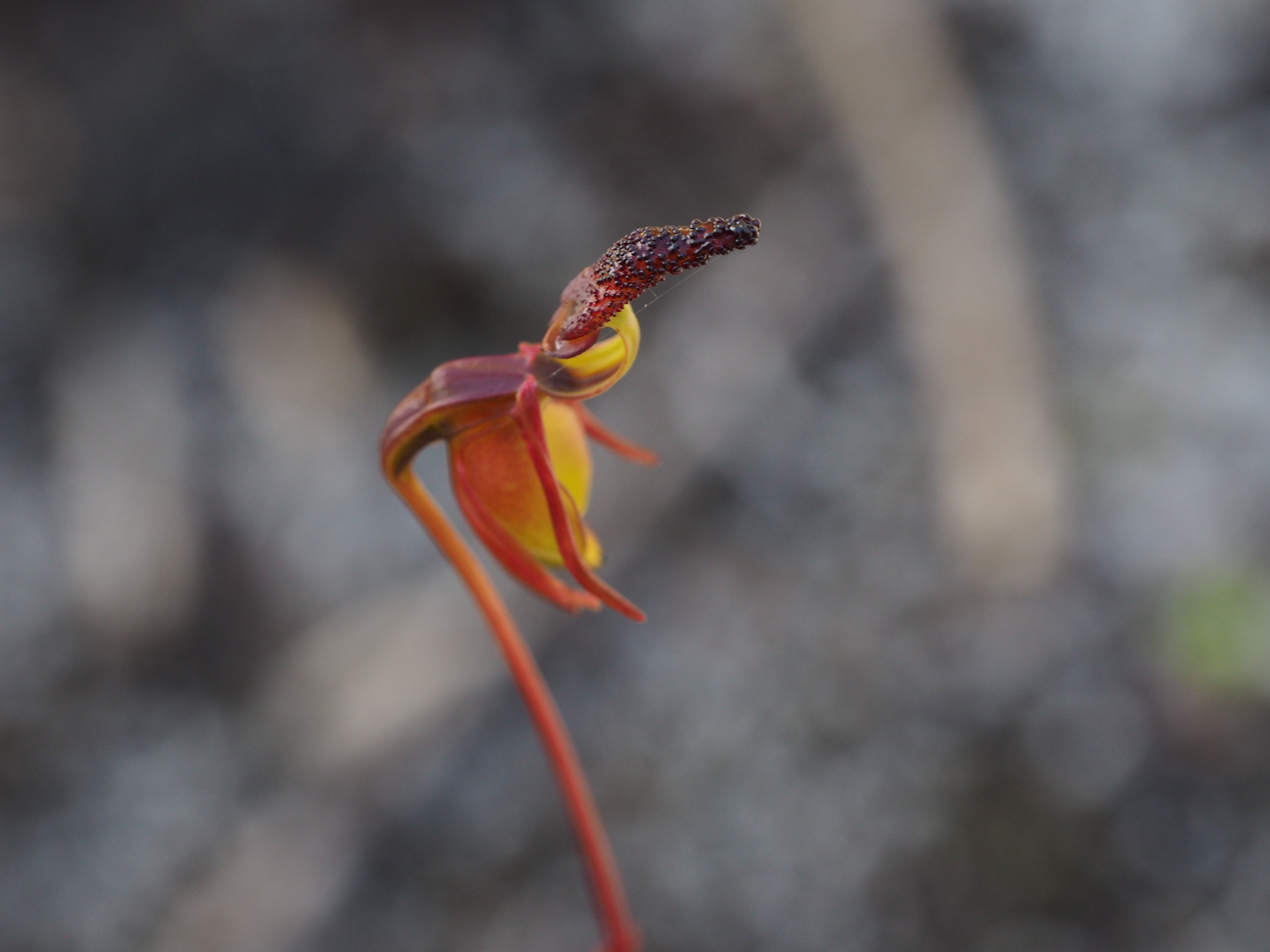
- Near Yallingup

Scientific classification
- Kingdom: Plantae
- Clade: Tracheophytes
- Clade: Angiosperms
- Clade: Monocots
- Order: Asparagales
- Family: Orchidaceae
- Subfamily: Orchidoideae
- Tribe: Diurideae
- Genus: Caleana
- Species: C. nigrita

Binomial name
- Caleana nigrita (J.Drumm. ex Lindl.) Blaxell

Synonyms
- Caleya nigrita (J.Drumm. ex Lindl.) F.Muell.; Paracaleana nigrita (J.Drumm. ex Lindl.) Blaxell; Sullivania nigrita (J.Drumm. ex Lindl.) D.L.Jones & M.A.Clem.

= Caleana nigrita =

Small duck orchid

Species of flowering plant

Caleana nigrita, commonly known as small duck orchid or flying duck orchid is a species of orchid endemic to the south-west of Western Australia. It is the most common of the flying duck orchids and has the widest distribution of the Western Australian species. It has a single smooth leaf and is distinguished from the others by its labellum which has a hump in the middle and calli covering two thirds of its outer end. Its dull colouration makes it difficult to find, especially in areas that are blackened by fire.

== Description ==
Caleana nigrita has a single smooth green or red leaf, 10–30 mm (0.4–1 in) long and 7–11 mm (0.3–0.4 in) wide. One or two greenish-yellow and red flowers, 16–27 mm (0.6–1 in) long and 9–16 mm (0.4–0.6 in) wide are borne on a stalk 50–150 mm (2–6 in) high. The dorsal sepal, lateral sepals and petals hang downwards with the dorsal sepal pressed against the column which has broad wings, forming a bucket-like shape. Two-thirds of the outer part of the labellum is covered with glossy black glands or calli and the labellum has a small hump at its centre. Flowering occurs from August to October.

== Taxonomy and naming ==
Small duck orchid was first formally described in 1840 by John Lindley from an incomplete description by James Drummond in Edwards's Botanical Register. Drummond had given it the name Caleana nigrita and Lindley published his description in A Sketch of the Vegetation of the Swan River Colony. In 1972 Donald Blaxell changed the name to Paracaleana nigrita but the name change has not been accepted by the World Checklist of Selected Plant Families and in 1989 Mark Clements noted that none of the characters used to separate Paracaleana from Caleana is "sufficiently significant" to maintain two genera. The specific epithet (nigrita) is a Latin word meaning "blackened".

== Distribution and habitat ==
Caleana nigrita is found in near-coastal areas between Eneabba and Esperance in the Swan Coastal Plain, WarrenAvon Wheatbelt, Esperance Plains, Jarrah Forest and Mallee biogeographic regions where it usually grows in woodland and shrubland.

== Conservation ==
Caleana nigrita (as Paracaleana nigrita) is classified as "not threatened" by the Western Australian Government Department of Parks and Wildlife.
