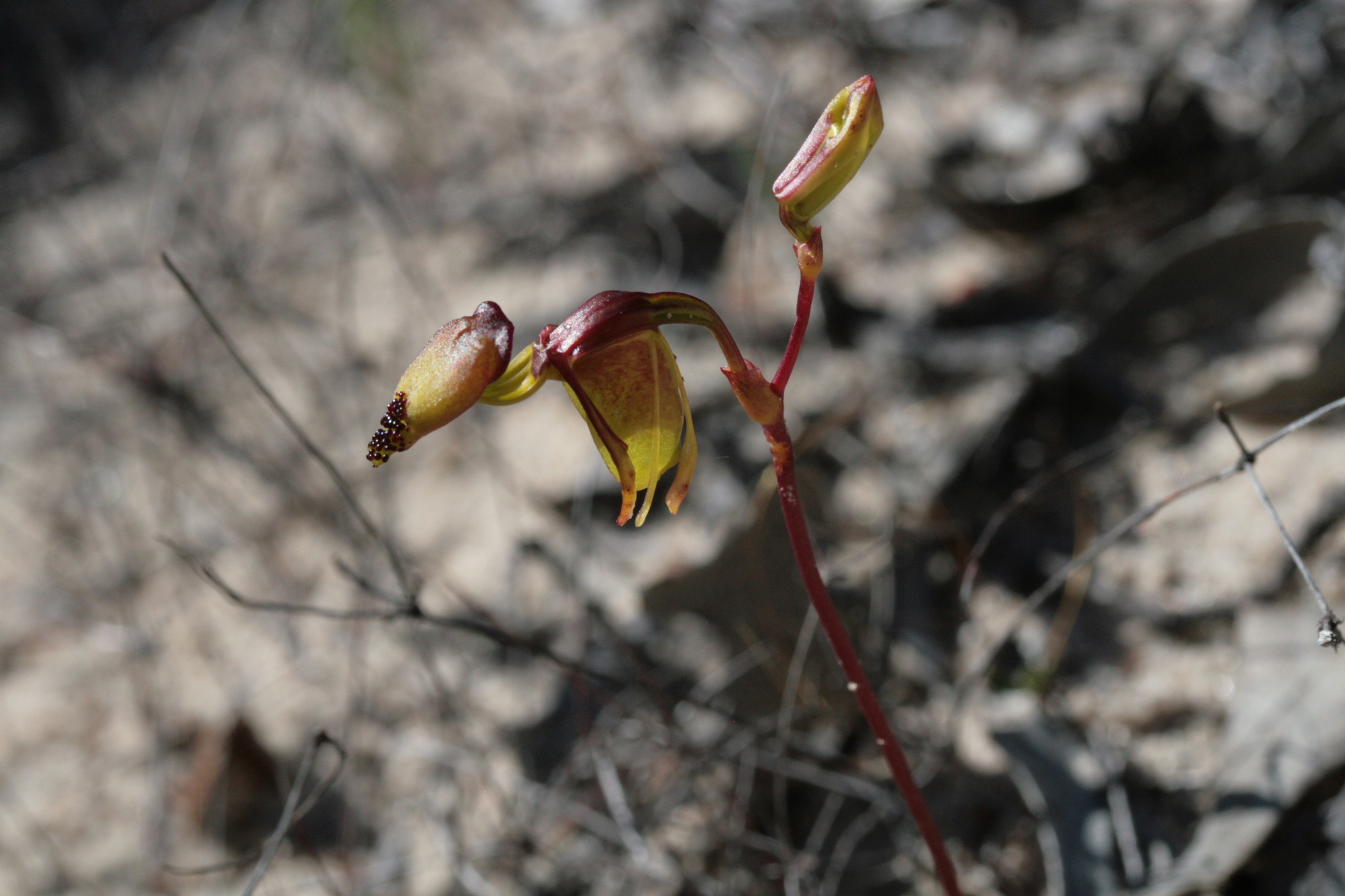

Scientific classification
- Kingdom: Plantae
- Clade: Tracheophytes
- Clade: Angiosperms
- Clade: Monocots
- Order: Asparagales
- Family: Orchidaceae
- Subfamily: Orchidoideae
- Tribe: Diurideae
- Genus: Caleana
- Species: C. terminalis

Binomial name
- Caleana terminalis (Hopper & A.P.Br.) M.A.Clem.

Synonyms
- Paracaleana terminalis Hopper & A.P.Br.

= Caleana terminalis =

Smooth-billed duck orchid

Species of flowering plant

Caleana terminalis, commonly known as smooth-billed duck orchid is a species of orchid endemic to a small area near the Murchison River in the south-west of Western Australia. It has a single smooth leaf and usually only a single greenish yellow and red flower. It is distinguished by its slightly humped labellum, with calli only on its outer one fifth.

== Description ==
Caleana terminalis has a single smooth, dull green or dull red leaf, 20–30 mm (0.8–1 in) long and 5–7 mm (0.2–0.3 in) wide. Unlike those of most other species of Caleana, the leaf is not withered at flowering time. Usually only one greenish yellow and red flower, 15–22 mm (0.6–0.9 in) long and 10–14 mm (0.4–0.6 in) wide is borne on a thin, wiry stalk 80–140 mm (3–6 in) high. The dorsal sepal, lateral sepals and petals are narrow and hang downwards with the dorsal sepal pressed against the column which has broad wings, forming a bucket-like shape. About one fifth of the outer part of the labellum is covered with glossy black glands or calli and the labellum has a slightly humped top. Flowering occurs in August and September.

== Taxonomy and naming ==
The smooth-billed duck orchid was first formally described in 2006 by Stephen Hopper and Andrew Brown who gave it the name Paracaleana terminalis. The description was published in Australian Systematic Botany from a specimen collected from the Z Bend in the Murchison River Gorge near Kalbarri. In 2014, based on molecular studies, Joseph Miller and Mark Clements transferred all the species previously in Paracaleana to Caleana so that the present species became Caleana terminalis. The specific epithet (terminalis) is a Latin word meaning "of ends or boundaries", referring to the callus being confined to the very tip of the labellum.

== Distribution and habitat ==
Caleana terminalis grows in sandy soil in shrubland between the Pinjarega Nature Reserve and Nerren Nerren station in the Geraldton Sandplains biogeographic region.

== Conservation ==
Caleana terminalis (as Paracaleana terminalis) is classified as "not threatened" by the Western Australian Government Department of Parks and Wildlife.
