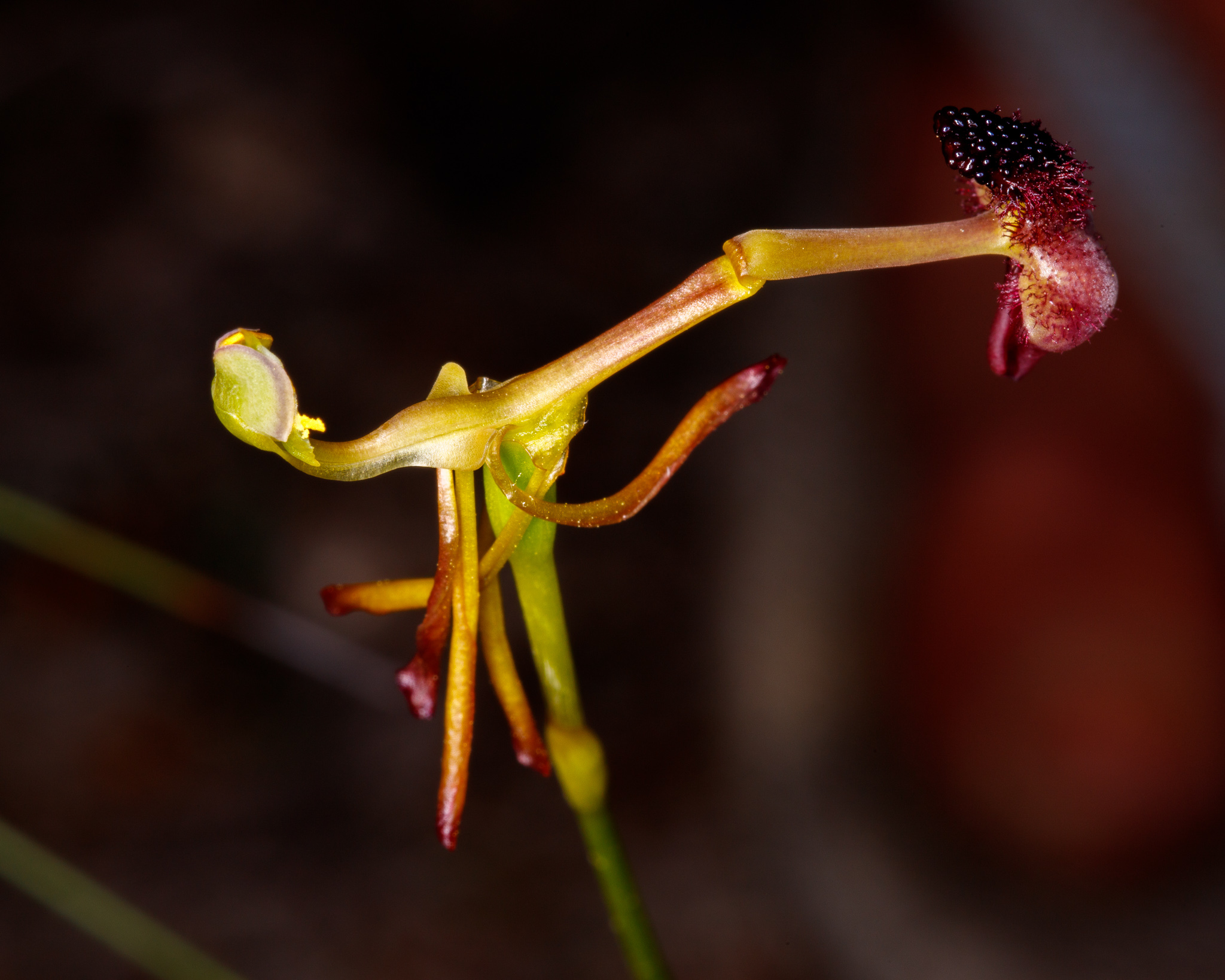

Conservation status
- Vulnerable (EPBC Act)

Scientific classification
- Kingdom: Plantae
- Clade: Tracheophytes
- Clade: Angiosperms
- Clade: Monocots
- Order: Asparagales
- Family: Orchidaceae
- Subfamily: Orchidoideae
- Tribe: Diurideae
- Genus: Drakaea
- Species: D. concolor

Binomial name
- Drakaea concolor Hopper & A.P.Br.

= Drakaea concolor =

Kneeling hammer orchid

Species of orchid endemic to Western Australia

Drakaea concolor, commonly known as the kneeling hammer orchid, is a species of orchid endemic to the south–west of Western Australia. The species is only known from a few areas in the far west of the state and has been declared "vulnerable" by the Australian Government and "threatened" by the Government of Western Australia.

== Description ==
Drakaea concolor is similar to others in the genus in that it has a single, ground hugging leaf and an underground tuber. In this case, the leaf is heart shaped, about 30 millimetres (1 in) in diameter, dark green and rather glossy. The leaf veins are inconspicuous. The stem is 25–30 centimetres (9.8–12 in) long and the stalk of the single flower is 10–15 millimetres (0.4–0.6 in) long.

Its flower is also similar to those of other hammer orchids in that the labellum resembles a flightless female thynnid wasp however it can be distinguished by lacking a spine on the column. The flowers of Drakaea glyptodon and Drakaea elastica also lack a spine, but can be distinguished from this species by having a light green leaf (D. elastica) or having distinct veins in the leaf (D. glyptdon). The sepal at the back of the flower is 12–15 millimetres (0.5–0.6 in) long and the two at the sides are 10–12 millimetres (0.4–0.5 in). The petals are also 10–12 millimetres (0.4–0.5 in) long. The insect-like labellum has a head about half as long as the body and its stalk, measured from the hinge is 7–8 millimetres (0.28–0.31 in) long. Unlike some other hammer orchids, the labellum is all the same dark maroon colour. Flowers appear in August and September.

== Taxonomy and naming ==
Drakaea concolor was first formally described by Stephen Hopper and Andrew Brown in 2007. Their description was published in Australian Systematic Botany. The specific epithet is from the Latin concolor and alludes to the uniform dark colour of the labellum.

== Distribution and habitat ==
The kneeling hammer orchid is only known from four areas near Geraldton, Kalbarri, Coorow and Northampton. Its distribution is the most northerly of the genus. It grows in sand in shrubland or woodland.

== Ecology ==
The kneeling hammer orchid is similar to other hammer orchids in that it is pollinated by a single species of male thynnid wasp using sexual deception. The orchid's labellum is similar in shape and scent to a flightless female thynnid wasp. The kneeling hammer orchid often grows in the same areas as other hammer orchids which are pollinated by a different species of thynnid wasp.

== Conservation ==
In 2008, the total known population of mature, flowering plants in this species was estimated as 120. The Western Australian Government Department of Parks and Wildlife classifies the species as "threatened" meaning that it is considered likely to become extinct, or rare and in need of special protection. The Australian Government lists its status under the Environmental Protection and Biodiversity Conservation Act as "vulnerable". The main threats to the species' survival are fire during its growing and flowering stages and grazing or trampling by pigs and goats in some habitats.
