= Caleana alcockii =

Alcock's duck orchid

Conservation status
- Priority Two — Poorly Known Taxa (DEC)

Scientific classification
- Kingdom: Plantae
- Clade: Tracheophytes
- Clade: Angiosperms
- Clade: Monocots
- Order: Asparagales
- Family: Orchidaceae
- Subfamily: Orchidoideae
- Tribe: Diurideae
- Genus: Caleana
- Species: C. alcockii

Binomial name
- Caleana alcockii (Hopper & A.P.Br.) M.A.Clem.

Synonyms
- Paracaleana alcockii Hopper & A.P.Br.

Species of flowering plant

Caleana alcockii, commonly known as Alcock's duck orchid is a rare species of orchid endemic to the south-west of Western Australia. It has a single smooth leaf and is distinguished by its humped labellum and relatively late flowering period. It only occurs north of Geraldton.

== Description ==
Caleana alcockii has a single smooth green or red leaf, 20–30 mm (0.8–1 in) long and 5–12 mm (0.2–0.5 in) wide. Usually only one greenish-yellow and red flower, about 20 mm (0.8 in) long and 10 mm (0.4 in) wide is borne on a thin, wiry stalk 80–160 mm (3–6 in) high. The dorsal sepal, lateral sepals and petals are narrow and hang downwards with the dorsal sepal pressed against the column which has broad wings, forming a bucket-like shape. About one-third of the outer part of the labellum is covered with glossy black glands or calli and the labellum has a prominent hump at its centre. Flowering occurs from September to October.

== Taxonomy and naming ==
Alcock's duck orchid was first formally described in 2006 by Stephen Hopper and Andrew Brown who gave it the name Paracaleana alcockii. The description was published in Australian Systematic Botany. In 2014, based on molecular studies, Joseph Miller and Mark Clements transferred all the species previously in Paracaleana to Caleana so that the present species became Caleana alcockii. The specific epithet (alcockii) honours John Alcock who recognised the species as distinct.

== Distribution and habitat ==
Caleana alcockii grows with grasses or sedges in sandy soil in a small area north of the Murchison River in the Geraldton Sandplains biogeographic region.

== Conservation ==
Caleana alcockii (as Paracaleana alcockii) is classified as "Priority Two" by the Western Australian Government Department of Parks and Wildlife meaning that it is poorly known and from only one or a few locations.
