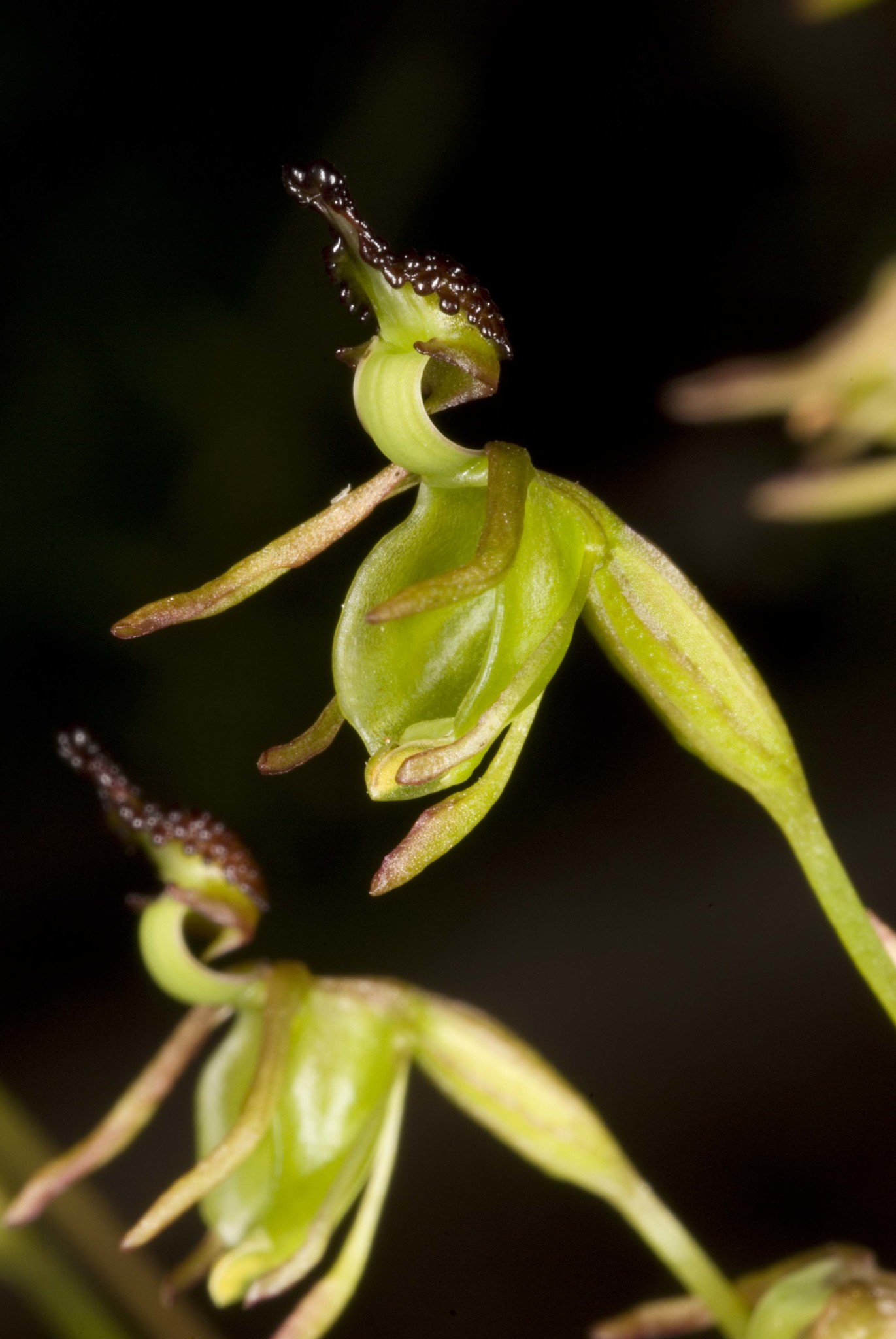

Conservation status
- Nationally Critical (NZ TCS)

Scientific classification
- Kingdom: Plantae
- Clade: Embryophytes
- Clade: Tracheophytes
- Clade: Spermatophytes
- Clade: Angiosperms
- Clade: Monocots
- Order: Asparagales
- Family: Orchidaceae
- Subfamily: Orchidoideae
- Tribe: Diurideae
- Genus: Caleana
- Species: C. minor

Binomial name
- Caleana minor R.Br.

Synonyms
- Paracaleana minor (R.Br.) Blaxell; Caleya minor (R.Br.) Sweet; Paracaleana sullivanii (F.Muell.) Blaxell; Caleana sullivanii (F.Muell.) Pescott; Caleya sullivanii F.Muell.; Sullivania minor (R.Br.) D.L.Jones & M.A.Clem.

= Caleana minor =

Small duck orchid

Species of flowering plant

Caleana minor, commonly known as the small duck orchid or flying duck orchid, is a species of orchid native to eastern Australia and the North Island of New Zealand. It has a single reddish brown, grass-like leaf and up to four yellowish to reddish flowers on a wiry flowering stem. The sepals and petals are directed downwards near the broad column wings and the labellum is directed upwards and covered with warty glands.

== Description ==
Caleana minor is a tuberous, perennial herb with a single reddish brown, linear leaf, 40–130 mm (2–5 in) long, 1–3 mm (0.04–0.1 in) wide and folded lengthwise. The leaf is usually withered by flowering time. Up to four yellowish green to reddish brown flowers, 14–16 mm (0.55–0.63 in) long and 5–7 mm (0.2–0.3 in) wide are borne on a flowering stem 80–150 mm (3–6 in) tall. The sepals and petals are 7–10 mm (0.3–0.4 in) long, 1–2 mm (0.04–0.08 in) wide and hang downwards forming a bucket-like shape with the broad wings of the column. The labellum is 5–6 mm (0.20–0.24 in) long, 3–4 mm (0.1–0.2 in) wide, covered with glossy black glands and held above the flower on a sensitive strap-like stalk about 5 mm (0.2 in) long. Flowering occurs from September to February although the flowering period is shorter in New Zealand.

== Taxonomy and naming ==
Caleana minor was first formally described in 1810 by Robert Brown from a specimen collected at Port Jackson in "sandy ground between brickfields and Barclay Lagoon". The description was published in Prodromus Florae Novae Hollandiae et Insulae Van Diemen. In 1972 Donald Blaxell changed the name to Paracaleana nigrita but the name change has not been accepted by the World Checklist of Selected Plant Families and in 1989 Mark Clements noted that none of the characters used to separate Paracaleana from Caleana is "sufficiently significant" to maintain two genera. The specific epithet (minor) is a Latin word meaning "less".

== Distribution and habitat ==
The small duck orchid occurs in eastern Australia and on the North Island of New Zealand. It is widespread and locally common in Australia, growing in a wide range of habitats but most commonly on ridges and slopes in forests. In Queensland, it is found south from the Carnarvon National Park. It occurs in the eastern half of New South Wales and as far west as Dubbo, throughout Victoria except in the far north-west, in the south-east of South Australia and in Tasmania.

In New Zealand the species is currently only known from Whakarewarewa near Rotorua and is regarded as "critically threatened". There were two other records, one in Kaitaia and the other at Waiotapu. The species may be indigenous to New Zealand, although some consider it an introduced species. It may have arrived as a seed from mud on an Australian visitor's shoe. Another theory is that seeds were blown from Australia in bushfire smoke.

== Ecology ==
This orchid is pollinated by insects. The labellum is held above the flower by a sensitive strap-like stalk. When touched, the labellum turns rapidly downward, trapping a visiting insect between the labellum and column wings.
