= Drakaea andrewsiae =

Lost hammer orchid

Conservation status
- Priority One — Poorly Known Taxa (DEC)

Scientific classification
- Kingdom: Plantae
- Clade: Tracheophytes
- Clade: Angiosperms
- Clade: Monocots
- Order: Asparagales
- Family: Orchidaceae
- Subfamily: Orchidoideae
- Tribe: Diurideae
- Genus: Drakaea
- Species: D. andrewsiae

Binomial name
- Drakaea andrewsiae Hopper & A.P.Br. (2007)

Species of orchid endemic to Western Australia

Drakaea andrewsiae, commonly known as the lost hammer orchid, is a species of orchid endemic to the south–west of Western Australia. The species was first collected in 1930, has only been collected on two other occasions and photographed a few other times. It was, however, not formally described until 2007.

== Description ==
Drakaea andrewsiae is only known from photographs and a few specimens of the flower and stem. Presumably it is similar to others in the genus in having a single, ground hugging leaf and an underground tuber. The stem is 20–22 centimetres (8–9 in) long and the stalk of the single flower is 10–12 millimetres (0.4–0.5 in) long.

Its flower is also similar to those of other hammer orchids in that the labellum resembles a flightless female thynnid wasp however it can be distinguished by having a spine on the column, a labellum with an erect tip on the end of the "tail", and a "body" that is spotted and densely covered with hair. The sepal at the back of the flower is 10–11 millimetres (0.39–0.43 in) long and the two at the sides are 9–11 millimetres (0.35–0.43 in). The petals are also 9–11 millimetres (0.35–0.43 in) long. The insect-like labellum has a head about one-quarter as long as the body and its stalk. Collections were made and photographs taken in September or the first week of October, reflecting the most likely flowering period.

== Taxonomy and naming ==
The first collection of Drakaea andrewsiae was made on 7 September 1930 by Mrs. P. Andrews near Gnowangerup. That specimen was forwarded to Richard Sanders Rogers in Adelaide but not formally described at that time. Two other collections were made in the Gnowangerup and Tunney districts and photographs were taken in the Porongurups and Stirling Range. The first formal description was made by Stephen Hopper and Andrew Brown in 2007 using the Adelaide specimen as the type. Their description was published in Australian Systematic Botany. The specific epithet (andrewsiae) honours the type collector, "Mrs. Andrews".

== Distribution and habitat ==
The lost hammer orchid is only known from areas between Gnowangerup and Tunney. It presumably grows in sandy soil, as do all the other Drakaea, and from evidence in photographs, possibly near granite rocks.

== Conservation ==
Drakaea andrewsiae is classified as "Priority One" by the Government of Western Australia Department of Parks and Wildlife, meaning that it is known from only one or a few locations, which are potentially at risk.
