= Caleana lyonsii =

Midget duck orchid

Scientific classification
- Kingdom: Plantae
- Clade: Tracheophytes
- Clade: Angiosperms
- Clade: Monocots
- Order: Asparagales
- Family: Orchidaceae
- Subfamily: Orchidoideae
- Tribe: Diurideae
- Genus: Caleana
- Species: C. lyonsii

Binomial name
- Caleana lyonsii (Hopper & A.P.Br.) M.A.Clem.

Synonyms
- Paracaleana lyonsii N.Hoffman & A.P.Br. nom. inval.; Paracaleana lyonsii Paczk. & A.R.Chapm. nom. inval.; Paracaleana lyonsii Hopper & A.P.Br.

Species of flowering plant

Caleana lyonsii, commonly known as midget duck orchid is a species of orchid endemic to the south-west of Western Australia. It is distinguished by its single smooth narrow leaf which is usually withered by flowering time and its up to ten small, greenish flowers. It grows in harsh environments in disjunct populations between Kalbarri and Southern Cross and has the smallest flowers of its genus in Western Australia.

== Description ==
Caleana lyonsii has a single leaf, 4–10 mm (0.2–0.4 in) long, 4–8 mm (0.2–0.3 in) wide and which is usually withered at flowering time. Up to ten greenish-yellow flowers, 12–15 mm (0.5–0.6 in) long and 4–5 mm (0.16–0.20 in) wide are borne on a thin, wiry stalk 60–200 mm (2–8 in) high. The dorsal sepal and petals are narrow and hang downwards with the dorsal sepal pressed against the column which has broad wings, forming a bucket-like shape. The lateral sepals are also narrow but bend outwards. The entire upper surface of the labellum is covered with glands or calli and those nearer the tip are darker. Flowering occurs from late September to November.

== Taxonomy and naming ==
Midget duck orchid was first formally described in 2006 by Stephen Hopper and Andrew Brown who gave it the name Paracaleana lyonsii. The description was published in Australian Systematic Botany. In 2014, based on molecular studies, Joseph Miller and Mark Clements transferred all the species previously in Paracaleana to Caleana so that the present species became Caleana lyonsii. The specific epithet (lyonsii) honours Mike Lyons, who discovered the species in 1994.

== Distribution and habitat ==
Caleana lyonsii grows in harsh environments including a sand ridge near Paynes Find. It occurs in disjunct populations north of Kalbarri, near Koolyanobbing and near Southern Cross in the Coolgardie, Geraldton Sandplains and Yalgoo biogeographic regions.

== Conservation ==
Caleana lyonsii (as Paracaleana lyonsii) is classified as "not threatened" by the Western Australian Government Department of Parks and Wildlife.
