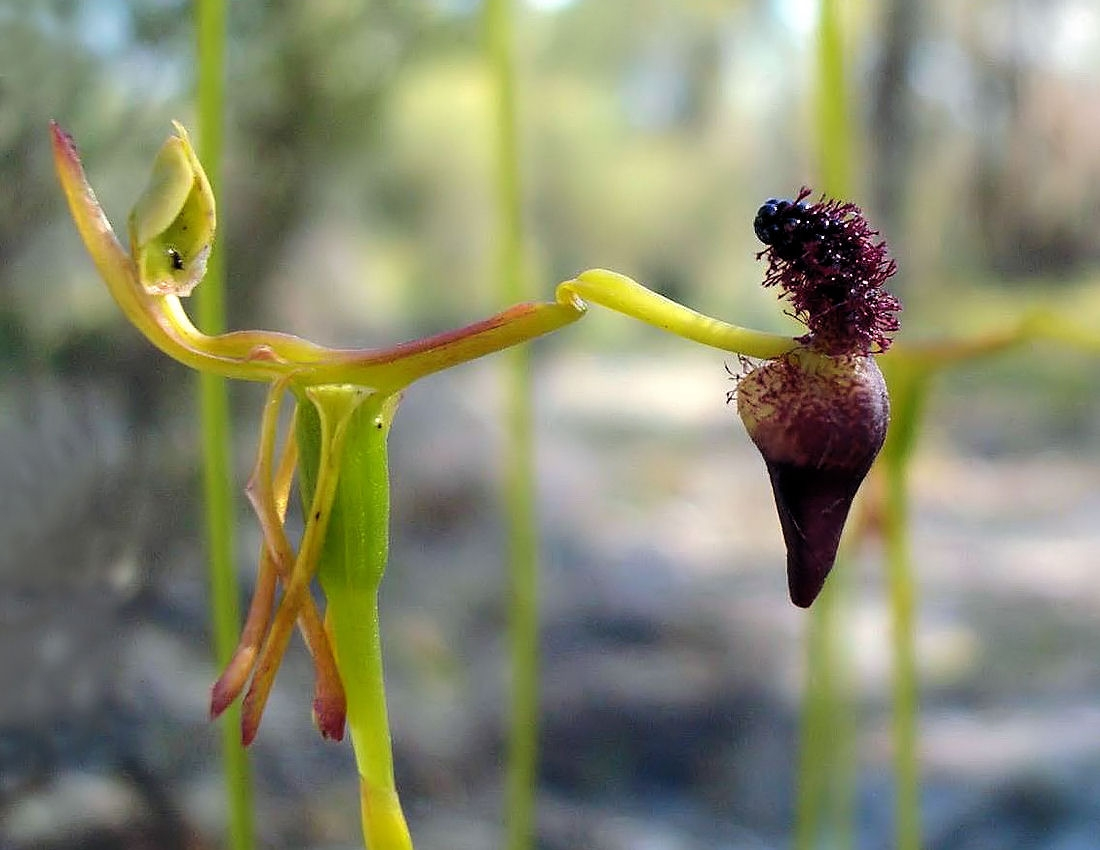

Conservation status
- Endangered (EPBC Act)

Scientific classification
- Kingdom: Plantae
- Clade: Tracheophytes
- Clade: Angiosperms
- Clade: Monocots
- Order: Asparagales
- Family: Orchidaceae
- Subfamily: Orchidoideae
- Tribe: Diurideae
- Genus: Drakaea
- Species: D. elastica

Binomial name
- Drakaea elastica Lindl. (1840)

= Drakaea elastica =

Glossy-leaved hammer orchid

Species of orchid endemic to Western Australia

Drakaea elastica, commonly known as glossy-leaved hammer orchid or praying virgin is a species of orchid endemic to the south–west of Western Australia. It is similar to other hammer orchids in that it is pollinated by a single species of male thynnid wasp using sexual deception. The orchid's labellum is similar in shape and scent to a flightless female thynnid wasp. The glossy-leaved hammer orchid was the first in the genus to be described. The species is only known from the far south-west of the state and has been declared "endangered" by both the Australian government and the government of Western Australia.

== Description ==
Drakaea elastica is similar to others in the genus in that it has a single, ground hugging leaf and an underground tuber. In this case, the leaf is heart shaped, about 20 millimetres (0.8 in) in diameter, glabrous, light green and glossy. The leaf veins are slightly darker in colour. Leaves appear in July or August but by the time the flower has opened, the leaf is often withered. The stem is 12–30 centimetres (4.7–12 in) long and the stalk of the single flower is 10–12 millimetres (0.4–0.5 in) long.

Its flower is also similar to those of other hammer orchids in that the labellum resembles a flightless female thynnid wasp, in this case Zaspilothynnus gilesi. It can be distinguished from other species by its lack of a spine on the column. The flowers of Drakaea glyptodon and Drakaea concolor also lack a spine but can be distinguished from this species by having a dark green leaf (D. concolor) or distinct veins in the leaf (D. glyptodon). The sepal at the back of the flower is 12–15 millimetres (0.5–0.6 in) long and the two at the sides are 12–14 millimetres (0.5–0.6 in). The petals are also 12–14 millimetres (0.5–0.6 in) long. The insect-like labellum has a "head" about half as long as the "body" and is light coloured and hairy for most of it length. The rest of the labellum (representing the female "body" of the insect) is light green on the upper half, with a few scattered dark spots while the lower half is dark maroon. Flowers appear from late September to early November.

== Taxonomy and naming ==
Drakaea elastica was first formally described by John Lindley in 1840 in A Sketch of the Vegetation of the Swan River Colony. Since then the name has been misapplied to other hammer orchids, including the more common one known as warty hammer orchid (Drakaea livida). The specific epithet (elastica) is derived from the Ancient Greek word elastikos meaning "elastic".

== Distribution and habitat ==
The glossy-leaved hammer orchid is only known from the Cataby and Busselton districts in the Swan Coastal Plain biogeographic zone. It grows in deep sand in woodland in low-lying areas near temporary swamps.

== Conservation ==
Drakaea elastica is known from 42 locations but most of these contain fewer than 15 plants and only one contains half of the known individual plants. The Western Australian Government Department of Parks and Wildlife classifies the species as "threatened" meaning that it is considered likely to become extinct, or rare and in need of special protection. The Australian Government lists its status under the Environmental Protection and Biodiversity Conservation Act as "vulnerable". The main threats to the species' survival include weed invasion, recurrent fire, dieback disease, rubbish dumping and illegal vehicle usage.
