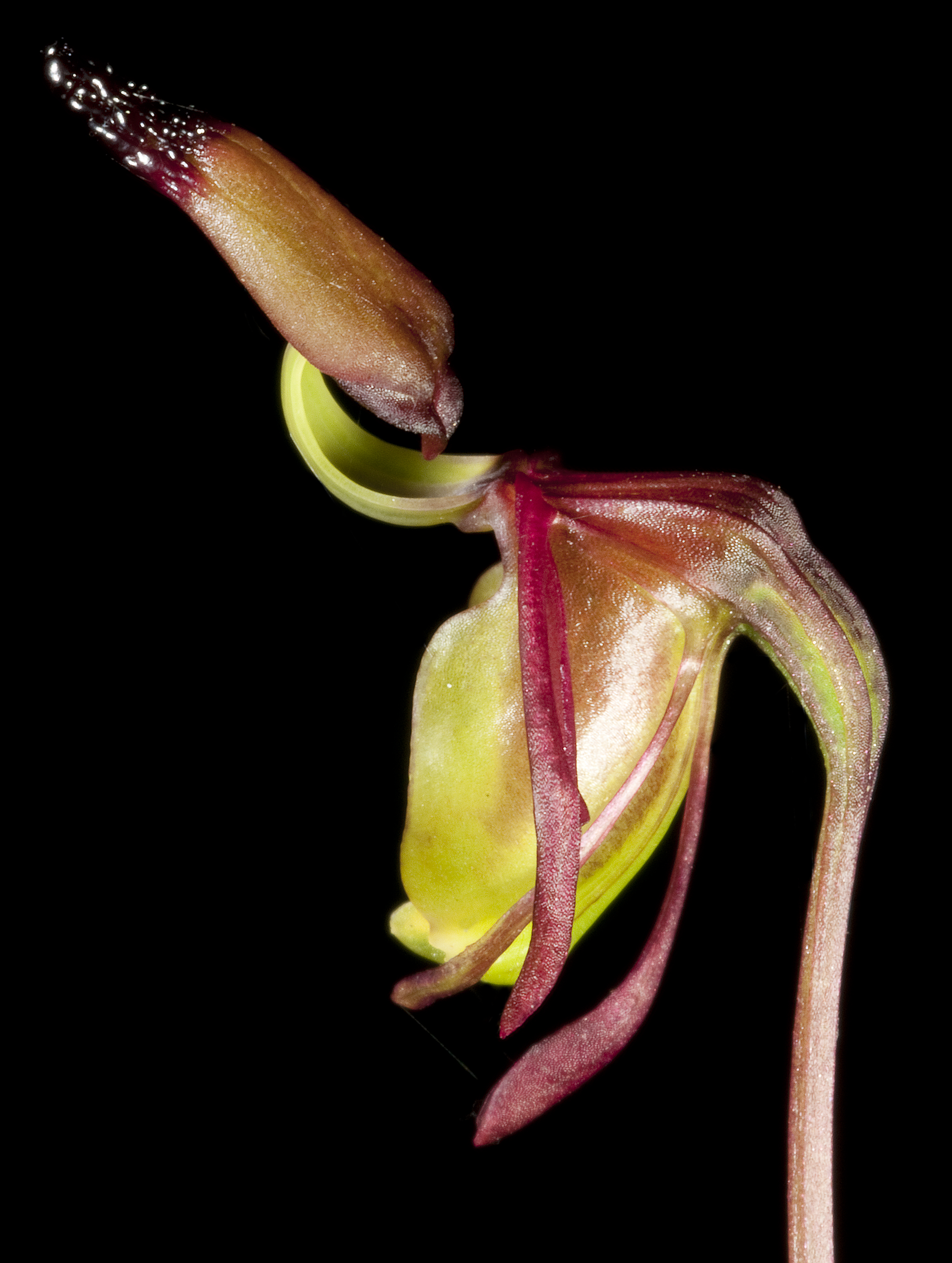
- Caleana triens in Wandoo National Park

Scientific classification
- Kingdom: Plantae
- Clade: Tracheophytes
- Clade: Angiosperms
- Clade: Monocots
- Order: Asparagales
- Family: Orchidaceae
- Subfamily: Orchidoideae
- Tribe: Diurideae
- Genus: Caleana
- Species: C. triens

Binomial name
- Caleana triens (Hopper & A.P.Br.) M.A.Clem.

Synonyms
- Paracaleana triens Hopper & A.P.Br.

= Caleana triens =

Broad-billed duck orchid

Species of flowering plant

Caleana triens, commonly known as broad-billed duck orchid is a species of orchid endemic to the south-west of Western Australia. It has a single smooth leaf and is distinguished by its flattened labellum with calli only near its tip and by its relatively early flowering period.

== Description ==
Caleana triens has a single smooth, dull green or dull red leaf, 15–30 mm (0.6–1 in) long and 6–11 mm (0.2–0.4 in) wide. Usually only one greenish yellow and red flower, 20–25 mm (0.8–1 in) long and 12–15 mm (0.5–0.6 in) wide is borne on a thin, wiry stalk 60–140 mm (2–6 in) high. The dorsal sepal, lateral sepals and petals are narrow and hang downwards with the dorsal sepal pressed against the column which has broad wings, forming a bucket-like shape. The labellum is flattened and only about one-third of the outer part of the labellum is covered with glossy black glands or calli. Flowering occurs in September and October.

== Taxonomy and naming ==
The broad-billed duck orchid was first formally described in 2006 by Stephen Hopper and Andrew Brown who gave it the name Paracaleana triens. The type specimen was collected near York and description was published in Australian Systematic Botany. In 2014, based on molecular studies, Joseph Miller and Mark Clements transferred all the species previously in Paracaleana to Caleana, so that the present species became Caleana triens. The specific epithet (triens) is a Latin word meaning "third", referring to there being calli only one-third of the outer part of the labellum.

== Distribution and habitat ==
Caleana triens grows in forest, woodland or shrubland in sandy soil between York and Esperance in the Avon Wheatbelt, Jarrah Forest and Mallee biogeographic regions.

== Conservation ==
Caleana triens (as Paracaleana triens) is classified as "not threatened" by the Western Australian Government Department of Parks and Wildlife.
