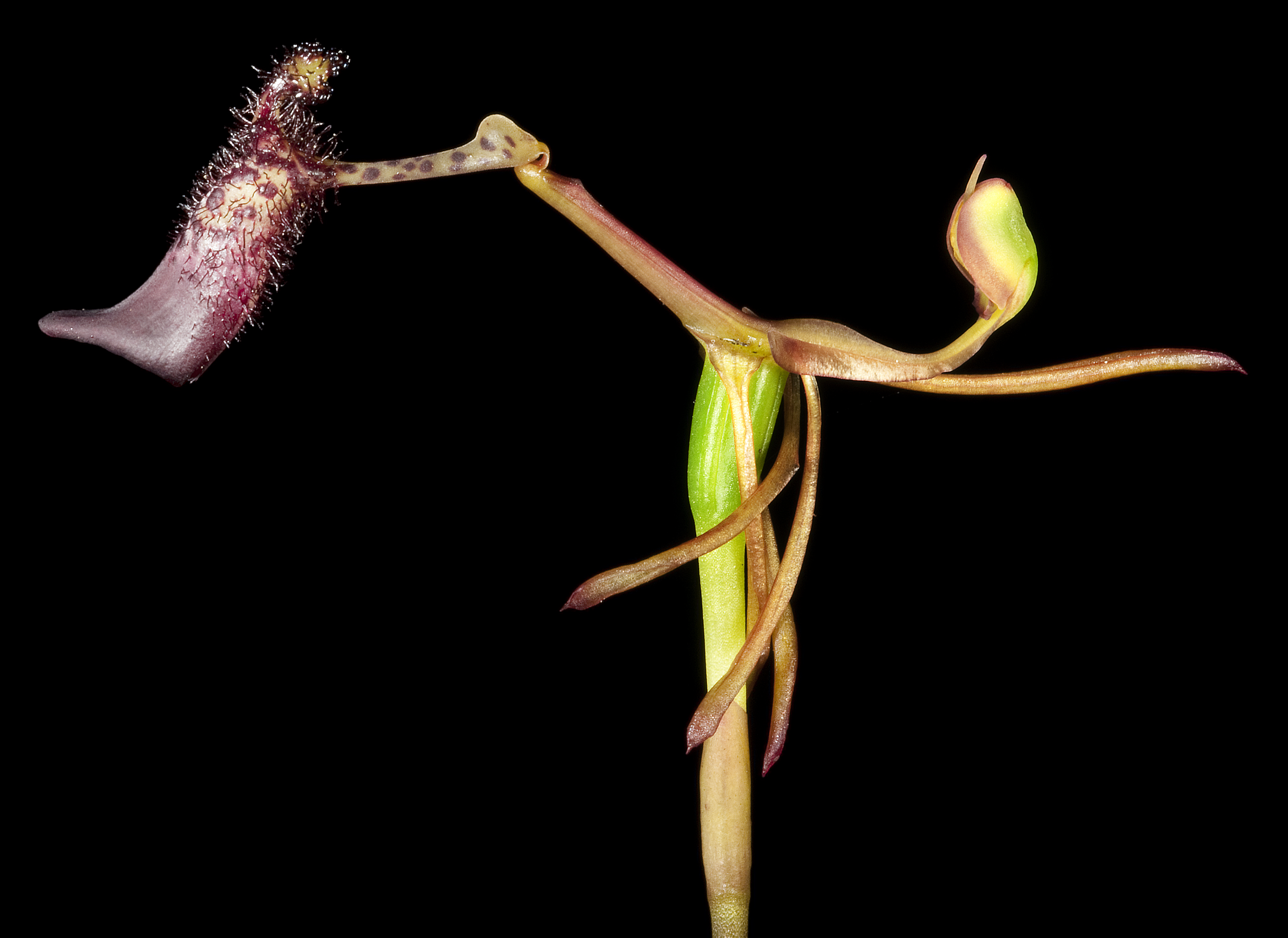

Scientific classification
- Kingdom: Plantae
- Clade: Tracheophytes
- Clade: Angiosperms
- Clade: Monocots
- Order: Asparagales
- Family: Orchidaceae
- Subfamily: Orchidoideae
- Tribe: Diurideae
- Genus: Drakaea
- Species: D. livida

Binomial name
- Drakaea livida J.Drumm.

Synonyms
- Drakaea fitzgeraldii Schltr.

= Drakaea livida =

Species of orchid endemic to Western Australia

Drakaea livida, commonly known as warty hammer orchid, is a species of orchid endemic to the south–west of Western Australia. It is pollinated by a single species of male thynnid wasp using sexual deception. The orchid's labellum is similar in shape and scent to a flightless female thynnid wasp. Although the species was formally described in 1842, the description was often later overlooked and other hammer orchids were given the name Drakea livida. It is now known to be, along with Drakaea glyptodon, one of the most widespread of the genus.

== Description ==
Drakaea livida is similar to others in the genus in that it has a single, ground hugging leaf and an underground tuber. In this case, the leaf is heart shaped, about 20 millimetres (0.8 in) in diameter. The leaf is a somewhat glossy olive green with darker lines radiating from the attachment to the stem. The stem is 15–40 centimetres (6–20 in) long, sometimes longer and the stalk of the single flower is 12–15 millimetres (0.5–0.6 in) long.

The flower is also similar to those of other hammer orchids in that the labellum resembles a flightless female thynnid wasp, in this case Zaspilothynnus nigripes. This species can be distinguished by the pointed column, the pointed, upturned end of the labellum and the swollen labellum body. The sepal at the back of the flower is 12–15 millimetres (0.5–0.6 in) long and the two at the sides are 10–12 millimetres (0.4–0.5 in). The petals are also 10–12 millimetres (0.4–0.5 in) long. The insect-like labellum has a "head" about one-third long as the "body" and has a pair of dark projections near its base . The stalk of the labellum, joining it to the hinge, is spotted. The part of the labellum representing the female "body" of the insect greenish- yellow at the top end, spotted with maroon and the lower end is dark maroon in colour and swollen as in Drakaea glyptodon. The "head" part of the labellum is about one-quarter the length of the "body" and may be glabrous or covered with long hairs. Flowers appear from August to the middle of October.

== Taxonomy and naming ==
Drakaea livida was first formally described by James Drummond in 1842. The description was published in Hooker's London Journal of Botany. The specific epithet is a Latin word meaning "bluish", or "black and blue", referring to the blotched coloration of the flowers of this species.

== Distribution and habitat ==
Warty hammer orchid occurs in the Fitzgerald River National Park and towards Watheroo where it grows in sandy soils in woodland.

== Conservation ==
Drakaea livida is classified as "not threatened" by the Western Australian Government Department of Parks and Wildlife.
