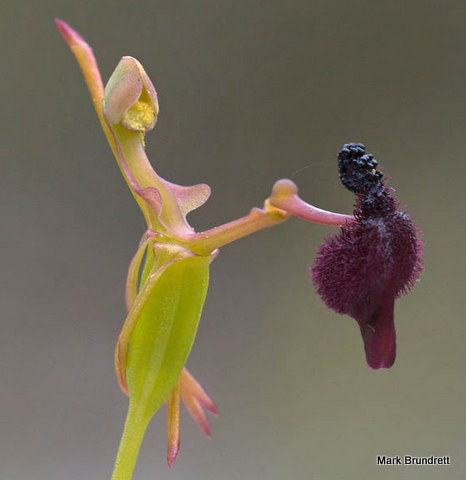
- Flower of Drakaea glyptodon

Scientific classification
- Kingdom: Plantae
- Clade: Tracheophytes
- Clade: Angiosperms
- Clade: Monocots
- Order: Asparagales
- Family: Orchidaceae
- Subfamily: Orchidoideae
- Tribe: Diurideae
- Subtribe: Drakaeinae
- Genus: Drakaea; Lindl.

= Drakaea =

Hammer orchid

Genus of orchids

Drakaea is a genus of 10 species in the plant family Orchidaceae commonly known as hammer orchids. All ten species occur only in the south-west of Western Australia. Hammer orchids are characterised by an insectoid labellum that is attached to a narrow, hinged stem, which holds it aloft. The stem can hinge only backwards, where the broadly winged column carries the pollen and stigma. Each species of hammer orchid is pollinated by a specific species of thynnid wasp. Thynnid wasps are unusual in that the female is flightless and mating occurs when the male carries a female away to a source of food. The labellum of the orchid resembles a female thynnid wasp in shape, colour and scent. Insect pollination involving sexual attraction is common in orchids but the interaction between the male thynnid wasp and the hammer orchid is unique in that it involves the insect trying to fly away with a part of the flower.

== Description ==
Hammer orchids have a single thumbnail-sized, flat, heart-shaped, fleshy, ground-hugging leaf and a long, thin, wiry stem. The stem bears a leaf-like bract below half way and a single flower at its summit. The flower is highly modified in that the labellum resembles a female thynnid wasp in shape and colour and which produces a scent that mimics a pheromone produced by the female. There is a single (male) stamen bearing two pollinia close to the single (female) stigma. After fertilisation, the ovary develops into a non-fleshy capsule containing up to 500 seeds.

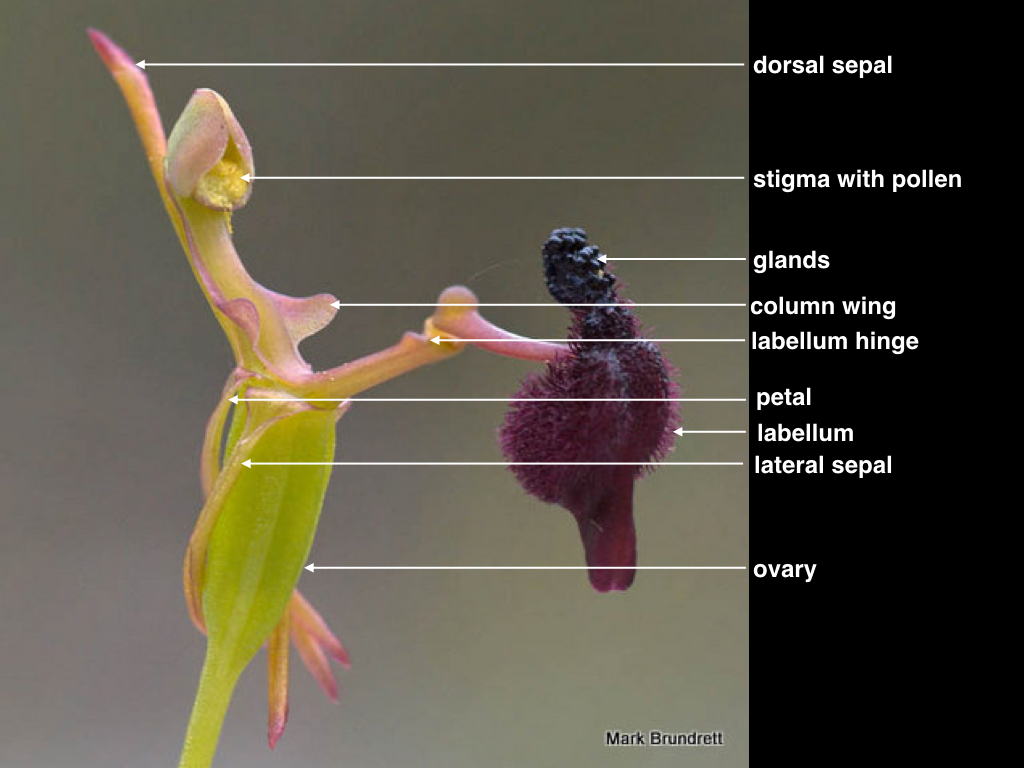
D. glyptodon labelled image

=== Pollination mechanism ===
Many orchid species have structures, or produce scents that mimic female insects and are attractive to males. Hammer orchids are unique in that they are pollinated by a species of male thynnid wasp (Superfamily Vespoidea, Family Thynnidae). Thynnid wasps are unique in that the females are flightless. When male wasps emerge from the ground, they search for females. When the flightless female wasps emerge, they climb a blade of grass, rub their legs together, release a pheromone and wait for males. When a male detects the pheromone, it flies in a zig-zag pattern upwind until the female is located. The male grasps the female and flies away with her to a food source. Copulation occurs in flight and the male feeds his mate through his abdomen. She is then left to return to the ground, lay her eggs in beetle larvae and die.

The orchid produces a chemical that mimics the pheromone produced by the female wasp and is strongly attractive to male thynnid wasps. (One researcher had male wasps follow his car, fly through the open windows and locate orchids on the floor of the car.) When a male is attracted by the pheromone-like scent released by the orchid and by its shape, it tries to fly away with the labellum, making the stem holding it move backwards. This in turn brings the male wasp's thorax in contact with the sticky pollen packet. The male wasp tires of trying to remove the labellum and flies off. In order for the hammer orchid to be successfully pollinated, the male wasp must visit another individual orchid, where it goes through the same procedure. This time the pollen is deposited on the stigma, and so that plant has been pollinated.

Usually each species of orchid is pollinated by a specific species of wasp, but there are exceptions. One hammer orchid species shares a pollinator with other kinds of orchid and one population of Drakaea concolor attracts a rare and poorly known wasp whilst another also attracts a second, far more common species.

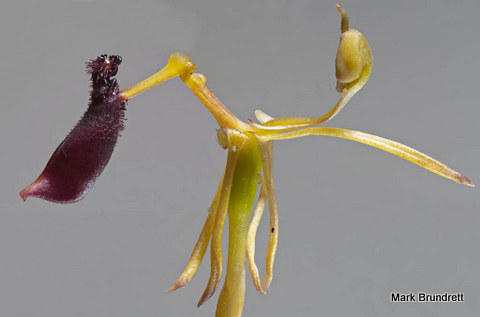
Drakaea thynniphila

== Taxonomy and naming ==
The taxonomy of many orchid genera is debated and there have been many changes to genera such as Caladenia. Hammer orchids, however are unique, are easily distinguished from other genera and there have been few changes to the limits of the genus since they were first described. However, there has been confusion and disagreement about classification within the genus. The latest review was carried out by Stephen Hopper and Andrew Brown in 2007.

The first species of hammer orchid to be formally described was Drakaea elastica. John Lindley described that species in 1840 in A Sketch of the Vegetation of the Swan River Colony. The common name (hammer orchid) refers to the shape of the labellum and the way it moves when the flower is being pollinated by a male insect. The genus name (Drakaea) honours Sarah ("Ducky") Drake, a botanical artist who drew orchids and other plants to assist taxonomists in England in the 19th century.

== Distribution and habitat ==
The ten species of Drakaea are all found within the south-west botanical province of Western Australia, between the Esperance and Geraldton districts. They usually grow in sandy soil in loose, scattered colonies.

== Conservation ==
Five species of Drakaea have been classified by the Western Australian government Department of Parks and Wildlife as "Threatened", meaning that they are likely to become extinct or are in need of special protection and one is listed as "Priority One" meaning that it is known from one or a few locations which are potentially at risk.

A study has shown that the rarity of many species of Drakaea is most likely to be due to habitat loss, the rarity of the specific pollinator or a narrow habitat requirement than the absence of the required mycorrhizal fungus or because of poor rates of germination.

== List of species ==
The following is a listed of species accepted by the World Checklist of Selected Plant Families as at July 2019:

- Drakaea andrewsiae Hopper & A.P.Br – lost hammer orchid;
- Drakaea concolor Hopper & A.P.Br – kneeling hammer orchid;
- Drakaea confluens Hopper & A.P.Br – late hammer orchid;
- Drakaea elastica Lindl. – glossy-leaved hammer orchid;
- Drakaea glyptodon Fitzg. – king in his carriage;
- Drakaea gracilis Hopper & A.P.Br – slender hammer orchid;
- Drakaea isolata Hopper & A.P.Br – lonely hammer orchid;
- Drakaea livida J.Drumm. – warty hammer orchid;
- Drakaea micrantha Hopper & A.P.Br – dwarf hammer orchid;
- Drakaea thynniphila A.S.George – narrow-lipped hammer orchid.
