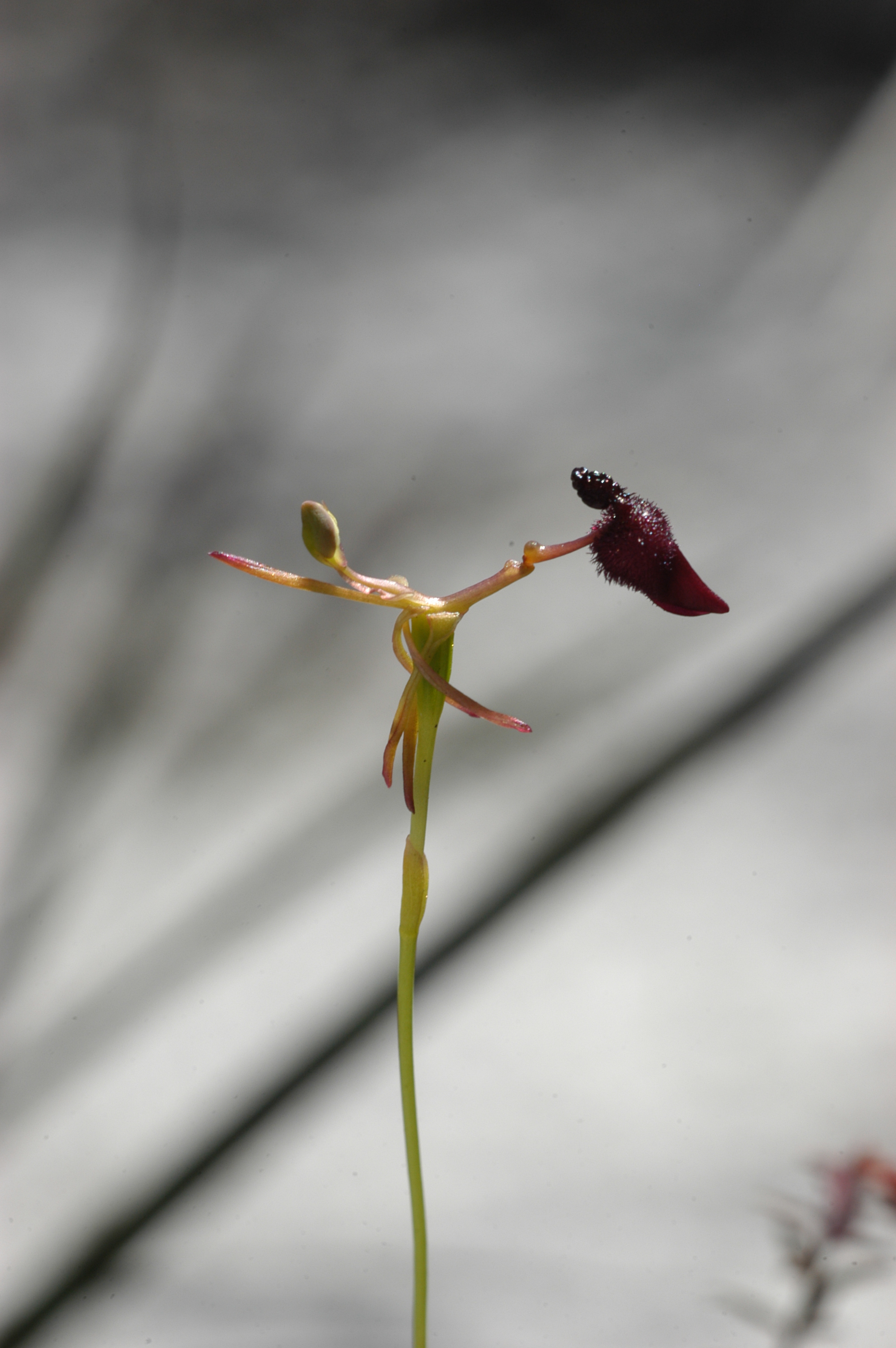
- King in his carriage on Mt Lindesay, near Denmark

Scientific classification
- Kingdom: Plantae
- Clade: Tracheophytes
- Clade: Angiosperms
- Clade: Monocots
- Order: Asparagales
- Family: Orchidaceae
- Subfamily: Orchidoideae
- Tribe: Diurideae
- Genus: Drakaea
- Species: D. glyptodon

Binomial name
- Drakaea glyptodon Fitz.

= Drakaea glyptodon =

Species of orchid endemic to Western Australia

Drakaea glyptodon, commonly known as king in his carriage is a species of orchid endemic to the south–west of Western Australia. It is pollinated by a single species of male thynnid wasp using sexual deception. The orchid's labellum is similar in shape and scent to a flightless female thynnid wasp. It is the most common drakaea and has the widest distribution.

== Description ==
Drakaea glyptodon is similar to others in the genus in that it has a single, ground hugging leaf and an underground tuber. In this case, the leaf is heart shaped, about 10 millimetres (0.4 in) in diameter, glabrous, dull blue-grey with darker lines radiating from the attachment to the stem. The stem is 10–35 centimetres (4–10 in) long and the stalk of the single flower is 8–15 millimetres (0.3–0.6 in) long.

Its flower is also similar to those of other hammer orchids in that the labellum resembles a flightless female thynnid wasp, except that the labellum is shorter and more swollen than those of other drakaeas. The flowers are pollinated by the wasp Zaspilothynnus trilobatus. King in his carriage can be distinguished by lacking a spine on the column. The flowers of Drakaea elastica and Drakaea concolor also lack a spine, but the species can be distinguished by having a glossy, dark green leaf (D. concolor) or having a glossy, light green leaf (D. elastica). The sepal at the back of the flower is 8–10 millimetres (0.3–0.4 in) long and the two at the sides are 7–9 millimetres (0.3–0.4 in). The petals are also 7–9 millimetres (0.3–0.4 in) long. The insect-like labellum has a "head" about one-third long as the "body", has only a few hairs and is covered with dark lumps. The rest of the labellum (representing the female "body" of the insect) is dark maroon in colour, hairy on the upper two-thirds and glabrous on the lower part. Flowers appear from late August to late October.

== Taxonomy and naming ==
Drakaea glyptodon was first formally described by Robert D. FitzGerald in 1882 in The Gardeners' Chronicle. The specific epithet (glyptodon) refers to "an extinct South American animal related to the Armadillo". "The whole lip [labellum] resembles in form (miniature, of course) the enormous extinct tortoise-monster, glyptodon, a creature as large as an ox and covered with tesselated scales."

== Distribution and habitat ==
King in his carriage occurs from near the Eneabba district to Condingup east of Esperance. It grows in sand or gravelly soils near swamps that fill in winter.

== Conservation ==
Drakaea glyptodon is classified as "not threatened" by the Western Australian Government Department of Parks and Wildlife.
