= Eriochilus dilatatus subsp. orientalis =

Eastern bunny orchid

Conservation status
- Priority Three — Poorly Known Taxa (DEC)

Scientific classification
- Kingdom: Plantae
- Clade: Tracheophytes
- Clade: Angiosperms
- Clade: Monocots
- Order: Asparagales
- Family: Orchidaceae
- Subfamily: Orchidoideae
- Tribe: Diurideae
- Genus: Eriochilus
- Species: E. dilatatus
- Subspecies: E. d. subsp. orientalis

Trinomial name
- Eriochilus dilatatus subsp. orientalis Hopper & A.P.Br.

Subspecies of orchid

Eriochilus dilatatus subsp. orientalis, commonly known as the eastern bunny orchid, is a plant in the orchid family Orchidaceae and is endemic to Western Australia. It has a single short, smooth, flattened, egg-shaped leaf and up to seven dull green, red and white flowers on a fleshy flowering stem. It only occurs on the coast near Caiguna.

== Description ==
Eriochilus dilatatus subsp. orientalis is a terrestrial, perennial, deciduous, herb with an underground tuber and a single smooth, flattened, egg-shaped leaf, 15–20 mm (0.6–0.8 in) long and 5–9 mm (0.2–0.4 in) wide. Up to seven (mostly between three and five) flowers 8–10 mm (0.3–0.4 in) long and 9–14 mm (0.4–0.6 in) wide are borne on a green, fleshy flowering stem 150–260 mm (6–10 in) tall. The flowers are greenish with red or mauve markings, except for the lateral sepals which are white and are well spaced along the flowering stem. The labellum has three lobes and scattered clusters of green and maroon bristles. Flowering occurs from April to May.

== Taxonomy and naming ==
Eriochilus dilatatus subsp. orientalis was first formally described in 2006 by Stephen Hopper and Andrew Brown from a specimen collected at Toolina Cove near Caiguna and the description was published in Nuytsia. The subspecies epithet (orientalis) is a Latin word meaning "of the east", referring to the distribution of this subspecies.

== Distribution and habitat ==
The eastern bunny orchid grows in shallow soil on limestone cliffs and nearby woodland between Caiguna and Toolina Cove.

== Conservation ==
Eriochilus dilatatus subsp. orientalis is classified as "Priority Three" by the Government of Western Australia Department of Parks and Wildlife meaning that it is poorly known and known from only a few locations but is not under imminent threat.
