= Eriochilus dilatatus subsp. magnus =

Easter bunny orchid

Scientific classification
- Kingdom: Plantae
- Clade: Tracheophytes
- Clade: Angiosperms
- Clade: Monocots
- Order: Asparagales
- Family: Orchidaceae
- Subfamily: Orchidoideae
- Tribe: Diurideae
- Genus: Eriochilus
- Species: E. dilatatus
- Subspecies: E. d. subsp. magnus

Trinomial name
- Eriochilus dilatatus subsp. magnus Hopper & A.P.Br.

Subspecies of orchid

Eriochilus dilatatus subsp. magnus, commonly known as the Easter bunny orchid, is a plant in the orchid family Orchidaceae and is endemic to Western Australia. It has a single large, smooth, flattened leaf and up to twenty five dull green, red and white flowers. It is found in high rainfall areas between Perth and Albany.

== Description ==
Eriochilus dilatatus subsp. magnus is a terrestrial, perennial, deciduous, herb with an underground tuber and a single smooth, flattened, broad egg-shaped leaf, 15–75 mm (0.6–3 in) long and 6–30 mm (0.2–1 in) wide with flat edges. Up to twenty five flowers 10–20 mm (0.4–0.8 in) long and 10–18 mm (0.4–0.7 in) wide are borne on a flowering stem 130–400 mm (5–20 in) tall. The flowers are dull green with red markings, except for the lateral sepals which are white. The labellum has three lobes, scattered clusters of red and white hairs and is prominently curved downwards. Flowering occurs from April to May.

== Taxonomy and naming ==
Eriochilus dilatatus subsp. magnus was first formally described in 2006 by Stephen Hopper and Andrew Brown from a specimen collected in the Warren National Park and the description was published in Nuytsia. The specific epithet (magnus) is a Latin word meaning "large", referring to the large leaf and tall habit of this subspecies.

== Distribution and habitat ==
The Easter bunny orchid grows in high rainfall forest and is locally common between Perth and Porongurup National Park in the Jarrah Forest, Swan Coastal Plain and Warren biogeographic regions.

== Conservation ==
Eriochilus dilatatus subsp. magnus is classified as "not threatened" by the Western Australian Government Department of Parks and Wildlife.
