= Eriochilus dilatatus subsp. multiflorus =

Common bunny orchid

Scientific classification
- Kingdom: Plantae
- Clade: Tracheophytes
- Clade: Angiosperms
- Clade: Monocots
- Order: Asparagales
- Family: Orchidaceae
- Subfamily: Orchidoideae
- Tribe: Diurideae
- Genus: Eriochilus
- Species: E. dilatatus
- Subspecies: E. d. subsp. multiflorus

Trinomial name
- Eriochilus dilatatus subsp. multiflorus (Lindl.) Hopper & A.P.Br.

Synonyms
- Eriochilus multiflorus Lindl.

Subspecies of orchid

Eriochilus dilatatus subsp. multiflorus, commonly known as the common bunny orchid, is a plant in the orchid family Orchidaceae and is endemic to Western Australia. It has a single short, smooth, flattened, egg-shaped leaf and up to twenty dull green, red and white flowers which are often closely packed. It grows in forest and woodland between Perth and Albany.

== Description ==
Eriochilus dilatatus subsp. multiflorus is a terrestrial, perennial, deciduous, herb with an underground tuber and a single smooth, flattened, egg-shaped leaf, 10–40 mm (0.4–2 in) long and 5–11 mm (0.2–0.4 in) wide. The leaf is held above ground on a stalk up to 100 mm (4 in) long and is often not fully developed at flowering time. When plants are not flowering, the leaf is much larger. Up to twenty flowers 10–15 mm (0.4–0.6 in) long and 10–12 mm (0.4–0.5 in) wide are borne on a flowering stem 250–450 mm (10–20 in) tall. The flowers are greenish with reddish markings, except for the lateral sepals which are white and are often crowded along the flowering stem. The dorsal sepal is egg-shaped to spatula-shaped, 8–10 mm (0.3–0.4 in) long and about 3 mm (0.1 in) wide. The lateral sepals are 10–17 mm (0.4–0.7 in) long and 2–4 mm (0.08–0.2 in) wide. The petals are 6–9 mm (0.2–0.4 in) long, about 1 mm (0.04 in) wide and turned towards the dorsal sepal. The labellum is greenish to cream-coloured with red spots, 8–10 mm (0.3–0.4 in) long, 2.5–4.5 mm (0.1–0.2 in) wide with three lobes and scattered clusters of red and white bristles. Flowering occurs from March to June and is enhanced by fire the previous summer.

== Taxonomy and naming ==
The common bunny orchid was first formally described in 1840 by John Lindley who gave it the name Eriochilus multiflorus and published the description in A Sketch of the Vegetation of the Swan River Colony. In 2006, Stephen Hopper and Andrew Brown reduced it to subspecies status. The subspecies epithet (multiflorus) is a Latin word meaning "many-flowered".}

== Distribution and habitat ==
The common bunny orchid is widespread and common in woodland and forest between Perth and Albany.

== Conservation ==
Eriochilus dilatatus subsp. multiflorus is classified as "not threatened" by the Western Australian Government Department of Parks and Wildlife.
