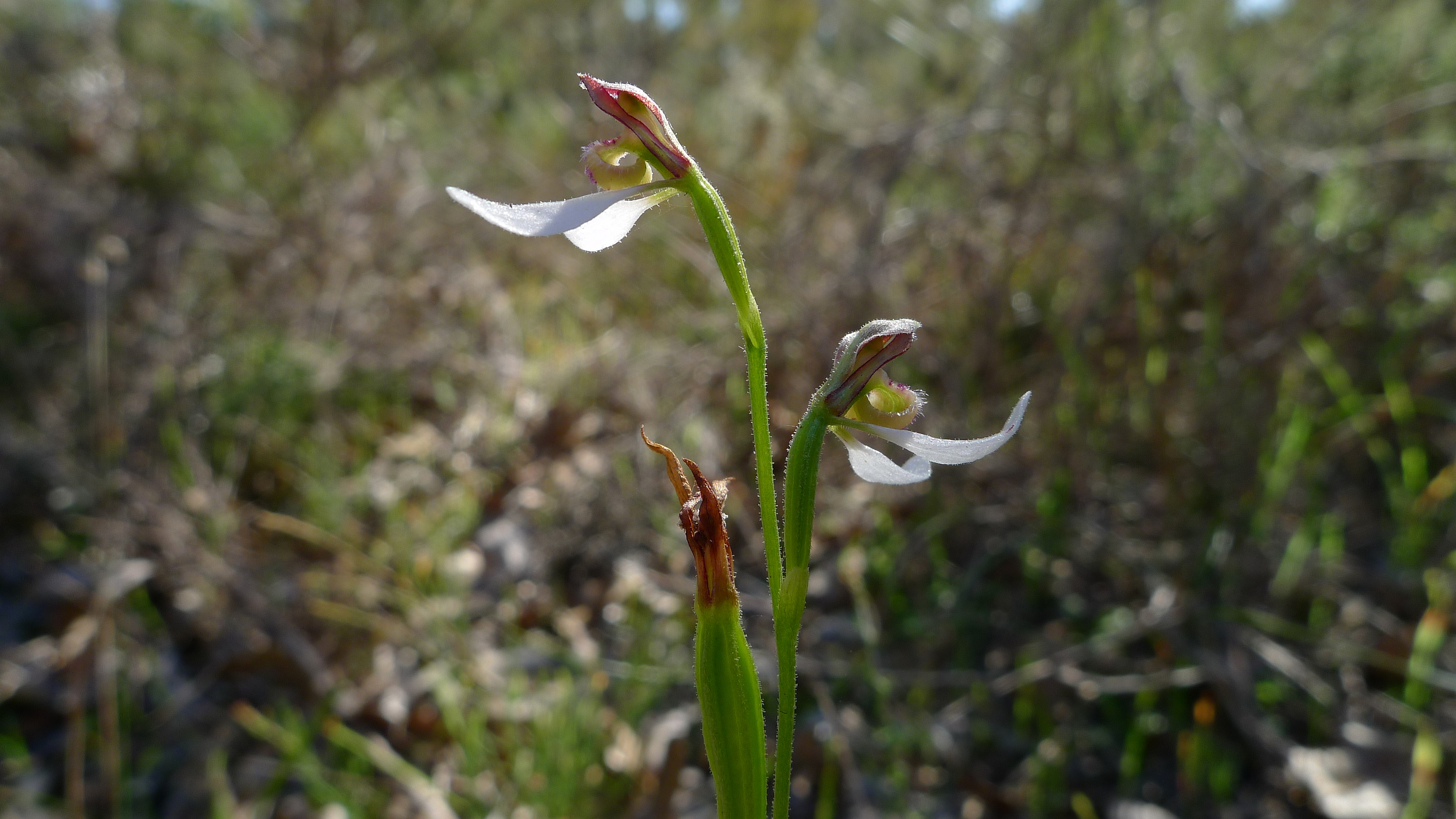
- Eriochilus dilatatus undulatus growing in Swan View

Scientific classification
- Kingdom: Plantae
- Clade: Tracheophytes
- Clade: Angiosperms
- Clade: Monocots
- Order: Asparagales
- Family: Orchidaceae
- Subfamily: Orchidoideae
- Tribe: Diurideae
- Genus: Eriochilus
- Species: E. dilatatus
- Subspecies: E. d. subsp. undulatus

Trinomial name
- Eriochilus dilatatus subsp. undulatus Hopper & A.P.Br.

= Eriochilus dilatatus subsp. undulatus =

Crinkle-leaved bunny orchid

Subspecies of orchid

Eriochilus dilatatus subsp. undulatus, commonly known as the crinkle-leaved bunny orchid, is a plant in the orchid family Orchidaceae and is endemic to Western Australia. It has a common orchid in the wheatbelt and has single narrow egg-shaped leaf with wavy edges and a maroon underside. Up to three dull green, red and white flowers are borne on a wiry flowering stem.

== Description ==
Eriochilus dilatatus subsp. undulatus is a terrestrial, perennial, deciduous, herb with an underground tuber and a single narrow egg-shaped leaf, 15–20 mm (0.6–0.8 in) long and 2–7 mm (0.08–0.3 in) wide. The leaf has wavy edges and a pale maroon lower surface with greenish streaks. Up to three flowers 10–15 mm (0.4–0.6 in) long and 9–14 mm (0.4–0.6 in) wide are borne on a wiry green flowering stem 100–200 mm (4–8 in) tall. The flowers are greenish with red or mauve markings, except for the lateral sepals which are white. The labellum has three lobes and scattered clusters of pale cream-coloured and maroon hairs. Flowering occurs from April to May and is not stimulated by fires.

== Taxonomy and naming ==
Eriochilus dilatatus subsp. undulatus was first formally described in 2006 by Stephen Hopper and Andrew Brown from a specimen collected in the Wongan Hills and the description was published in Nuytsia. The subspecies epithet (undulatus) is a Latin word meaning "wavy", referring to the edges of the leaves of plants in flower.

== Distribution and habitat ==
The crinkle-leaved bunny orchid is widespread and common in a wide variety of habitats from woodland to granite outcrops from Northampton to near Esperance and inland as far as Mullewa.

== Conservation ==
Eriochilus dilatatus subsp. undulatus is classified as "not threatened" by the Western Australian Government Department of Parks and Wildlife.
