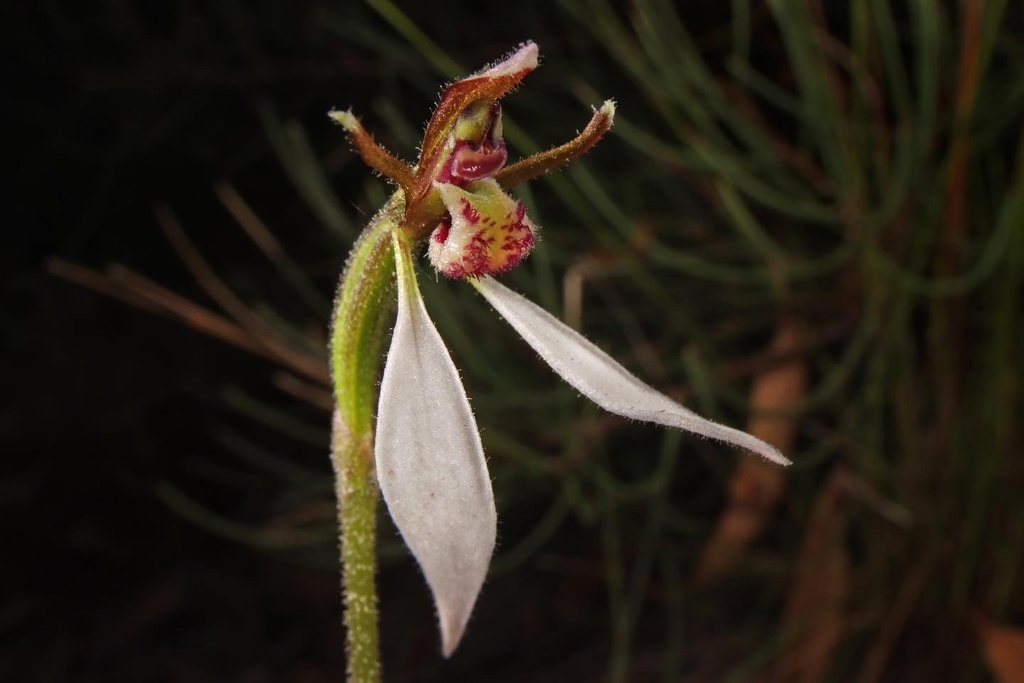
- In the Adelaide Hills

Scientific classification
- Kingdom: Plantae
- Clade: Embryophytes
- Clade: Tracheophytes
- Clade: Angiosperms
- Clade: Monocots
- Order: Asparagales
- Family: Orchidaceae
- Subfamily: Orchidoideae
- Tribe: Diurideae
- Genus: Eriochilus
- Species: E. collinus

Binomial name
- Eriochilus collinus D.L.Jones & R.J.Bates

= Eriochilus collinus =

Species of orchid

Eriochilus collinus is a plant in the orchid family Orchidaceae and is endemic to South Australia. It is a slender ground orchid with a heart-shaped, fleshy leaf and usually up to two small, white flowers tinged with pink, and grows in grassy woodland.

== Description ==
Eriochilus collinus is similar to Eriochilus cucullatus, differing mainly in its heart-shaped, fleshy leaf that is dark green above and shiny deep purple or maroon on the lower surface, 15–40 mm (0.59–1.57 in) long and 10–20 mm (0.39–0.79 in) wide. The leaf is undeveloped at flowering time, and does not fully expand until after the seeds are shed. Usually up to three white flowers with pink tinges or pink lines are borne on a slender spike up to 220 mm (9 in) tall. The dorsal sepal is 7–9 mm (0.28–0.35 in) long and about 2.5–30 mm (0.098–1.181 in) wide and forms a hood over the labellum. The lateral sepals spread widely, egg-shaped to elliptic and asymmetic, 12–18 mm (0.47–0.71 in) long and 2.5–4.0 mm (0.098–0.157 in) wide. The petals are erect, linear, 7–9 mm (0.28–0.35 in) long and about 1 mm (0.039 in) wide. The labellum is erect at the base, then strongly curved down, 3.5–4.0 mm (0.14–0.16 in) long and about 2 mm (0.079 in) wide and greenish yellow with a smooth central groove. Flowering occurs from April to June.

== Taxonomy and naming ==
Eriochilus collinus was first formally described in 2016 by David Jones and Robert J. Bates in Australian Orchid Review from specimens collected by Bates in the Nuriootpa Woodlands in the Barossa Valley in 2001. The specific epithet (collinus) means 'pertaning to hills', referring "to the hilly country which seems to be its preferred habitat".

== Distribution and habitat ==
This orchid grows in gravelly clay, sand, loam and shallow soils aroung rocks in heathy or grassy woodland in the Mount Lofty Ranges in south and central South Australia, extending south to Kangaroo Island and north to Mount Remarkable.
