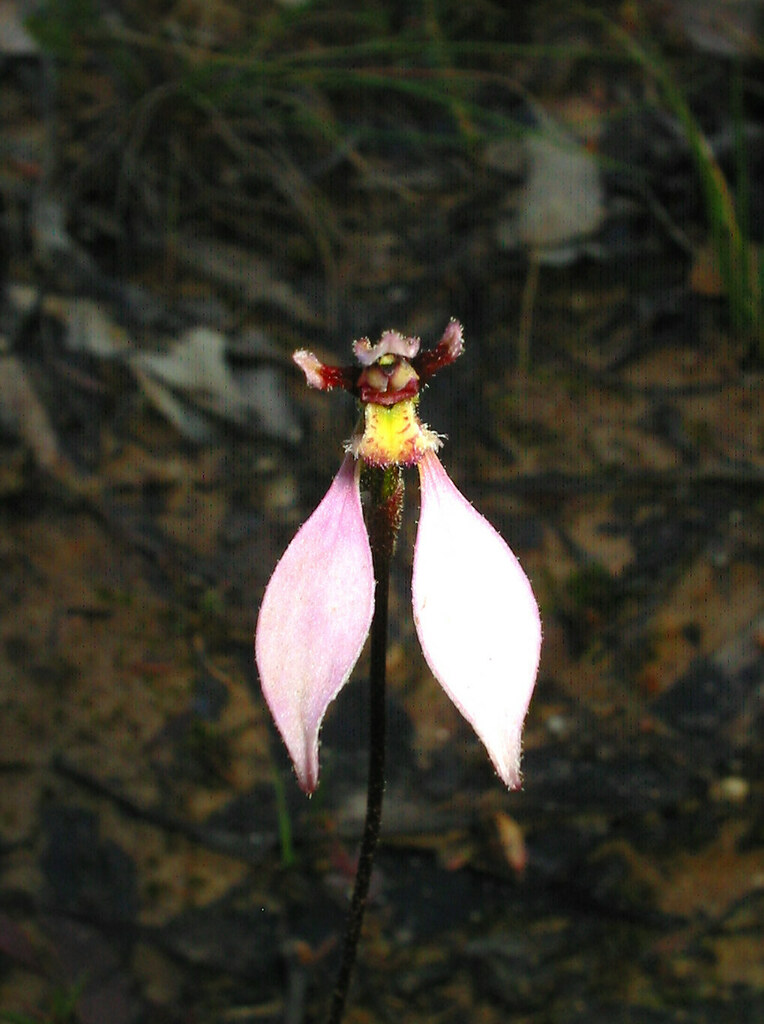

Scientific classification
- Kingdom: Plantae
- Clade: Embryophytes
- Clade: Tracheophytes
- Clade: Angiosperms
- Clade: Monocots
- Order: Asparagales
- Family: Orchidaceae
- Subfamily: Orchidoideae
- Tribe: Diurideae
- Genus: Eriochilus
- Species: E. petricola

Binomial name
- Eriochilus petricola D.L.Jones & M.A.Clem.

= Eriochilus petricola =

Species of orchid

Eriochilus petricola is a plant in the orchid family Orchidaceae and is endemic to New South Wales. It is a slender ground orchid with a single leaf and up to three small, white to pale pink flowers and grows near rock ledges.

== Description ==
Eriochilus petricola is a terrestrial, perennial, deciduous, herb with an underground tuber. It has a single, egg-shaped to almost round, dark green leaf 8–16 mm (0.3–0.6 in) long and 7–12 mm (0.3–0.5 in) wide with prominent veins and usually a hairy upper surface. Up to three white to pale pink flowers are borne on a slender spike up to 100 mm (4 in) tall. The dorsal sepal is 5–8 mm (0.2–0.3 in) long and about 2 mm (0.08 in) wide. The lateral sepals are linear to thread-like, 9–12 mm (0.4–0.5 in) long and 2.5–3.5 mm (0.098–0.14 in) wide. The petals are 5–7 mm (0.2–0.3 in) long and about 0.6 mm (0.02 in) wide. The labellum is 5–6.5 mm (0.2–0.3 in) long and about 2 mm (0.08 in) wide and fleshy with tufts of red bristles. Flowering occurs from March to May.

== Taxonomy and naming ==
Eriochilus petricola was first formally described in 2004 by David Jones and Mark Clements and the description was published in The Orchadian. The specific epithet (petricola) is derived from the Ancient Greek words petra meaning "rock" or "shelf or ledge of rock" and -cola meaning "dweller"

== Distribution and habitat ==
This orchid grows in shallow, sandy soil on and near rock ledges between Nowra, Ku-ring-gai Chase National Park and inland to the Blue Mountains.
