= Eriochilus dilatatus subsp. brevifolius =

Blunt-leaved bunny orchid

Scientific classification
- Kingdom: Plantae
- Clade: Embryophytes
- Clade: Tracheophytes
- Clade: Angiosperms
- Clade: Monocots
- Order: Asparagales
- Family: Orchidaceae
- Subfamily: Orchidoideae
- Tribe: Diurideae
- Genus: Eriochilus
- Species: E. dilatatus
- Subspecies: E. d. subsp. brevifolius

Trinomial name
- Eriochilus dilatatus subsp. brevifolius (Benth.) Hopper & A.P.Br.

Synonyms
- List: Eriochilus dilatatus subsp. orientalis Hopper & A.P.Br.; Eriochilus dilatatus subsp. undulatus N.Hoffman & A.P.Br. nom. inval.; Eriochilus dilatatus subsp. undulatus Paczk. & A.R.Chapm. nom. inval.; Eriochilus dilatatus subsp. undulatus Hopper & A.P.Br.; Eriochilus dilatatus var. brevifolius Benth.

Subspecies of orchid

Eriochilus dilatatus subsp. brevifolius, commonly known as the blunt-leaved bunny orchid, is a plant in the orchid family Orchidaceae and is endemic to Western Australia. It has a single small, smooth leaf with wavy edges and a pale red lower surface, and up to three greenish and white flowers with red or mauve markings. It is distinguished from the other subspecies by the colour of the lower surface of its leaf and by its later flowering period.

== Description ==
Eriochilus dilatatus subsp. brevifolius is a terrestrial, perennial, deciduous, herb with an underground tuber and a single smooth leaf, 10–20 mm (0.4–0.8 in) long, 4–6 mm (0.16–0.24 in) wide. The leaf has a pale red lower surface and wavy edges. Up to three flowers 10–15 mm (0.4–0.6 in) long and 9–14 mm (0.4–0.6 in) wide are borne on a flowering stem 50–250 mm (2–10 in) tall. The flowers are greenish with reddish markings, except for the lateral sepals which are white. The labellum is prominently down-curved and has three lobes with scattered clusters of red and white hairs. Flowering occurs from March to June.

== Taxonomy and naming ==
The blunt-leaved bunny orchid was first formally described in 2006 by Stephen Hopper and Andrew Brown from a specimen collected near the Murchison River. The subspecies epithet (brevifolius) is derived from the Latin words brevis meaning "short" and folium meaning "leaf".

== Distribution and habitat ==
The blunt-leaved bunny orchid grows in scrub and mallee-heath between Cataby and the Murchison River in the Geraldton Sandplains and Yalgoo biogeographic regions.

== Conservation ==
Eriochilus dilatatus subsp. brevifolius is classified as "not threatened" by the Western Australian Government Department of Parks and Wildlife.
