= Eriochilus glareosus =

Conservation status
- Priority One — Poorly Known Taxa (DEC)

Scientific classification
- Kingdom: Plantae
- Clade: Tracheophytes
- Clade: Angiosperms
- Clade: Monocots
- Order: Asparagales
- Family: Orchidaceae
- Subfamily: Orchidoideae
- Tribe: Diurideae
- Genus: Eriochilus
- Species: E. glareosus

Binomial name
- Eriochilus glareosus G.Brockman & C.J.French

Species of orchid

Eriochilus glareosus, commonly known as scarp bunny orchid, is a plant in the orchid family Orchidaceae and is endemic to a restricted area in the south-west of Western Australia. It is a terrestrial, tuberous herb with a single, egg-shaped, stem-clasping leaf and usually up to two small, white flowers with purple markings, and grows in disturbed places in woodland.

== Description ==
Eriochilus glareosus is a terrestrial, tuberous herb that typically grows to a height of 60–120 mm (2.4–4.7 in) tall, with a single, stem-clasping, egg-shaped leaf at about one-third of the height of the flowering stem, and is sometimes not fully developed at flowering time. The leaf is dark green above and deep purple or greenish purple on the lower surface, 6–20 mm (0.24–0.79 in) long and 5–10 mm (0.20–0.39 in) wide. Usually up to two white flowers with purple markings on the labellum are borne on a spike 50–100 mm (2.0–3.9 in) tall. The dorsal sepal is 6.0–7.5 mm (0.24–0.30 in) long and about 2.0–2.5 mm (0.079–0.098 in) wide. The lateral sepals spread widely, narrowly elliptic, 8–11 mm (0.31–0.43 in) long and 2.5–3.0 mm (0.098–0.118 in) wide. The petals project forwards, linear 5–6 mm (0.20–0.24 in) long and about 0.5–0.8 mm (0.020–0.031 in) wide, and greenish brown. The labellum is 7–9 mm (0.28–0.35 in) long and 2.5–3.0 mm (0.098–0.118 in) wide at its widest point, upward and forward near the base then curving down and back. Flowering occurs in June and July.

== Taxonomy and naming ==
Eriochilus glareosus was first formally described in 2022 by Garry Brockman and Christopher J. French in the journal Nuytsia from specimens collected by Brockman in Roleystone in 2004. The specific epithet (glareosus) means 'pertaning to gravel', "alluding to the preferred habitat of the species".

== Distribution and habitat ==
Scarp bunny orchid is mostly commonly found near open, revegetated gravel reserves in Jarrah and Casuarina woodland in a few locations in the Roleyston-Martin area in the Jarrah Forest bioregion of south-western Western Australia.

== Conservation status ==
Eriochilus glareosus is listed as 'Priority One' by the Government of Western Australia Department of Biodiversity, Conservation and Attractions, meaning that it is known from only one or a few locations which are potentially at risk.
