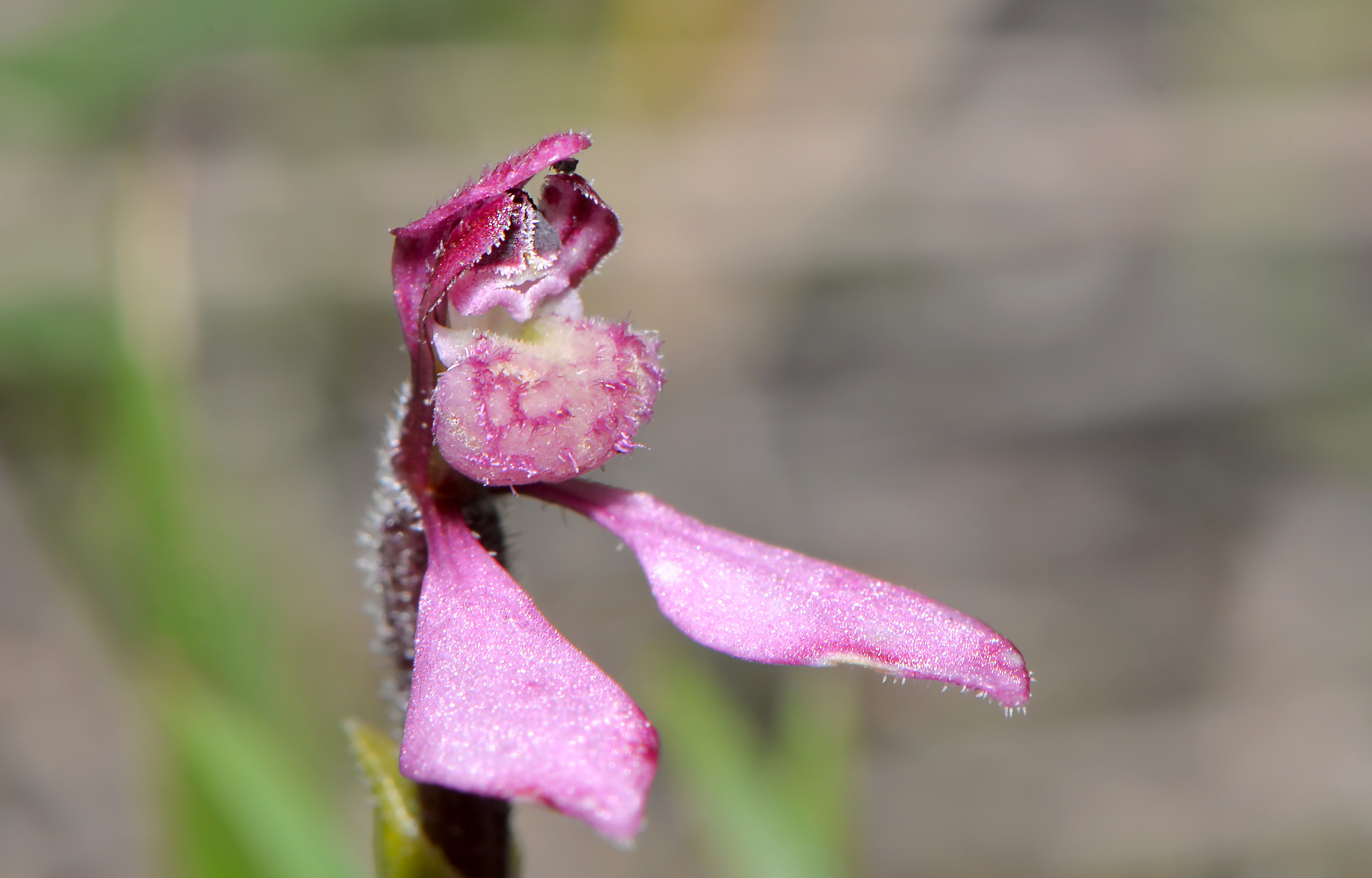

Scientific classification
- Kingdom: Plantae
- Clade: Tracheophytes
- Clade: Angiosperms
- Clade: Monocots
- Order: Asparagales
- Family: Orchidaceae
- Subfamily: Orchidoideae
- Tribe: Diurideae
- Genus: Eriochilus
- Species: E. tenuis

Binomial name
- Eriochilus tenuis Lindl.

= Eriochilus tenuis =

Slender bunny orchid

Species of orchid

Eriochilus tenuis, commonly known as the slender bunny orchid, is a plant in the orchid family Orchidaceae and is endemic to Western Australia. It has a single egg-shaped leaf lying flat on the ground and one or two small pink or pink and white flowers. A common species, it grows in dense, shrubby forest and in winter-wet swamps.

== Description ==
Eriochilus tenuis is a terrestrial, perennial, deciduous, herb with an underground tuber and a single egg-shaped leaf 10–40 mm (0.4–2 in) long and 5–15 mm (0.2–0.6 in) wide which lies flat on the ground. One or two pink or white flowers about 10 mm (0.4 in) long and wide are borne on a stem, 70–150 mm (3–6 in) tall. The dorsal sepal is egg-shaped with the narrower end towards the base, 6–8 mm (0.2–0.3 in) long and 2–3 mm (0.08–0.1 in) wide. The lateral sepals are 9–11 mm (0.4–0.4 in) long, 3–4 mm (0.1–0.2 in) wide and spread apart. The petals are narrow spatula-shaped, 5–7 mm (0.2–0.3 in) long, about 1 mm (0.04 in) wide and held close to the dorsal sepal. The labellum is pink, 6–8 mm (0.2–0.3 in) long, about 3 mm (0.1 in) wide and has three lobes. The middle lobe is egg-shaped, 2.5–3 mm (0.098–0.12 in) long and is fleshy with red bristles. Flowering occurs from September to November, more prolifically after fire the previous summer.

== Taxonomy and naming ==
Eriochilus tenuis was first formally described in 1840 by John Lindley and the description was published in A Sketch of the Vegetation of the Swan River Colony. The specific epithet (tenuis) is a Latin word meaning "thin", referring to the thin form of this orchid.

== Distribution and habitat ==
The slender bunny orchid grows in winter-wet swamps and in moss beds on granite outcrops between Perth and Albany.

== Conservation ==
Eriochilus tenuis is classified as "not threatened" by the Western Australian Government Department of Parks and Wildlife.
