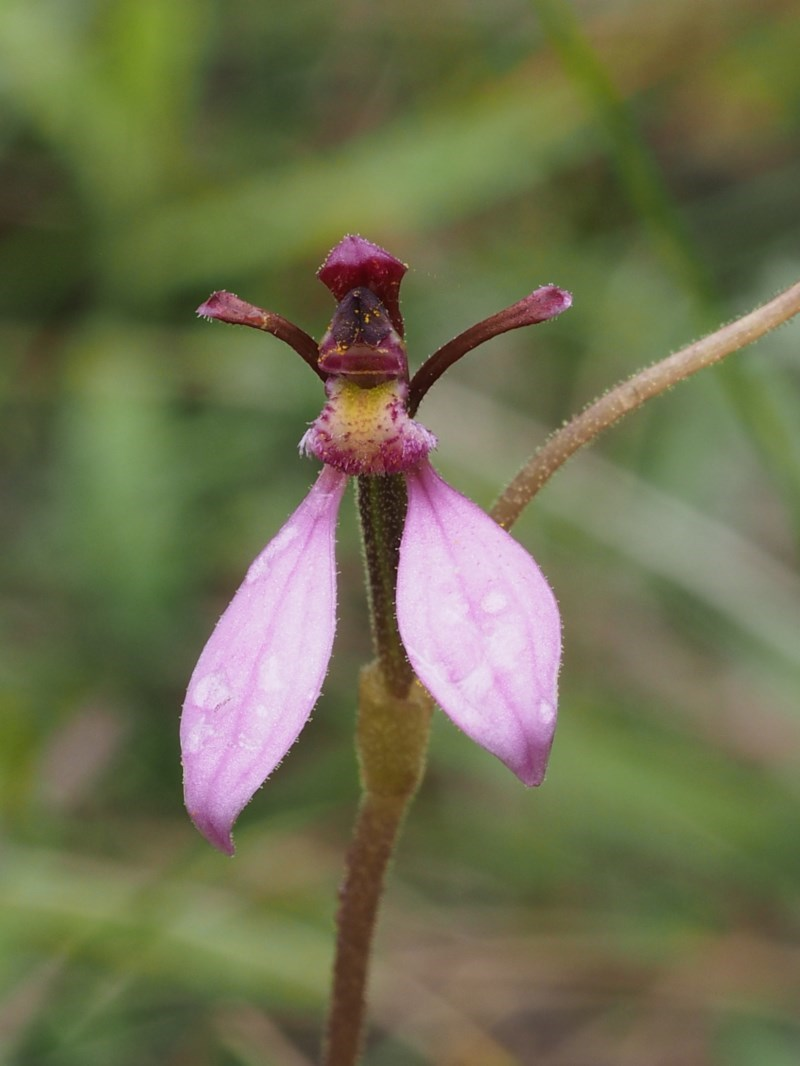
- Eriochilus magenteus growing near Paddys River in the A.C.T.

Scientific classification
- Kingdom: Plantae
- Clade: Tracheophytes
- Clade: Angiosperms
- Clade: Monocots
- Order: Asparagales
- Family: Orchidaceae
- Subfamily: Orchidoideae
- Tribe: Diurideae
- Genus: Eriochilus
- Species: E. magenteus

Binomial name
- Eriochilus magenteus D.L.Jones

= Eriochilus magenteus =

Magenta autumn orchid

Species of orchid

Eriochilus magenteus, commonly known as the magenta autumn orchid, is a plant in the orchid family Orchidaceae and is endemic to south eastern Australia. It is a slender ground orchid with a single leaf and one or two small, bright pink to magenta flowers. It is only found in higher areas of the Australian Capital Territory, southern New South Wales and north-eastern Victoria.

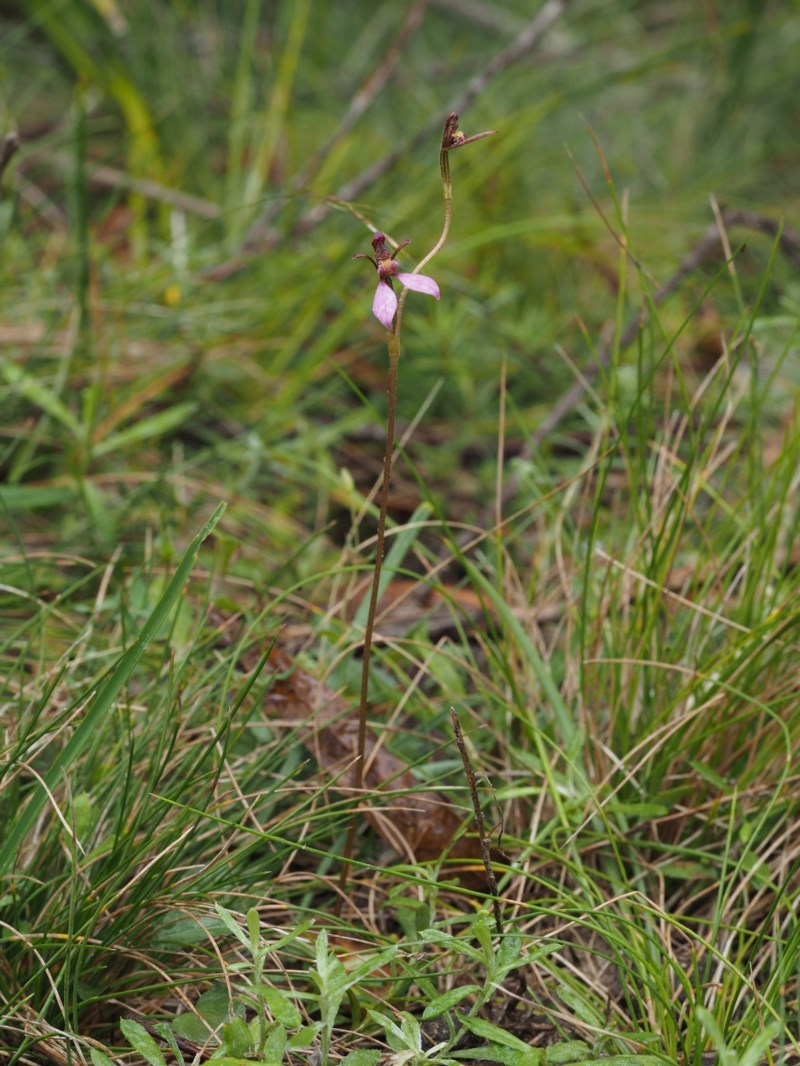
habit

== Description ==
Eriochilus cucullatus is a terrestrial, perennial, deciduous, herb with an underground tuber. It has a single, egg-shaped, bright shiny green, glabrous leaf which is not fully developed until after flowering, when it is 15–35 mm (0.6–1 in) long and 7–12 mm (0.3–0.5 in) wide. One or two bright pink to magenta flowers are borne on a slender spike, 100–250 mm (4–10 in) tall. The dorsal sepal is spoon-shaped to lance-shaped with the narrower end towards its base and 5–8 mm (0.2–0.3 in) long. The lateral sepals are 5–8 mm (0.2–0.3 in) long and turn downwards and away from each other. The petals are pink, linear in shape, 6–7 mm (0.2–0.3 in) long, erect and held near the column. The labellum is green or yellowish near its base, pinkish near the tip and has three lobes, the middle one egg-shaped and 2–3 mm (0.08–0.1 in) wide with small clusters of reddish bristles. Flowering occurs from December to March.

== Taxonomy and naming ==
Eriochilus magenteus was first formally described in 2008 by David Jones and the description was published in The Orchadian.

== Distribution and habitat ==
The magenta autumn orchid grows in moist soil in alpine meadows with grasses and sedges, sometimes near swamps and streams. It is found in the Australian Capital Territory, southern New South Wales and north-eastern Victoria.
