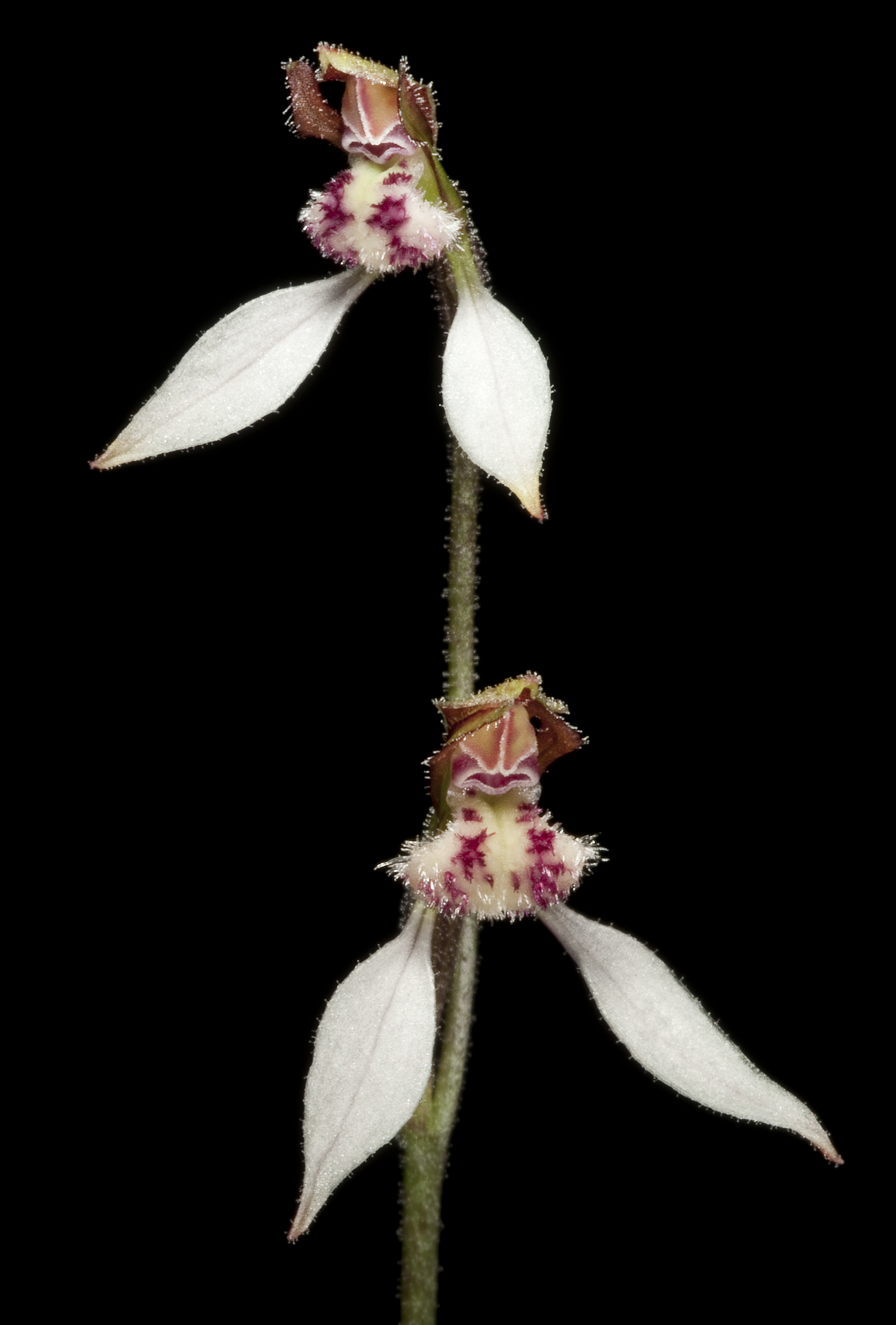

Scientific classification
- Kingdom: Plantae
- Clade: Embryophytes
- Clade: Tracheophytes
- Clade: Angiosperms
- Clade: Monocots
- Order: Asparagales
- Family: Orchidaceae
- Subfamily: Orchidoideae
- Tribe: Diurideae
- Genus: Eriochilus
- Species: E. helonomos

Binomial name
- Eriochilus helonomos Hopper & A.P.Br.

Synonyms
- Eriochilus helonomos N.Hoffman & A.P.Br. nom. inval.; Eriochilus helonomos Paczk. & A.R.Chapm. nom. inval.; Eriochilus helonomos J.R.Wheeler, N.G.Marchant & M.Lewington nom. inval.

= Eriochilus helonomos =

Swamp bunny orchid

Species of orchid

Eriochilus helonomos, commonly known as swamp bunny orchid, is a plant in the orchid family Orchidaceae and is endemic to Western Australia. It has a single pointed leaf and usually a single white or cream-coloured flower with reddish brown markings. A relatively common species, it usually grows in swampy places. It is distinguished from other bunny orchids by the arrangement of its petals.

== Description ==
Eriochilus helonomos is a terrestrial, perennial, deciduous, herb with an underground tuber and a single, egg-shaped glabrous leaf with a pointed tip, 7–17 mm (0.3–0.7 in) long and 2–10 mm (0.08–0.4 in) wide. Usually only a single flower but sometimes as many as three white or cream-coloured flowers about 10 mm (0.4 in) long and wide are borne on a stem, 50–150 mm (2–6 in) tall. The dorsal sepal is 6–8 mm (0.2–0.3 in) long and 3–4 mm (0.1–0.2 in) wide. The lateral sepals are 7–15 mm (0.3–0.6 in) long and 2–4 mm (0.08–0.2 in) wide and have pink markings on their underside. The petals have brownish red edges and are 6–10 mm (0.2–0.4 in) long and about 1 mm (0.04 in) wide. Unlike others in the genus the petals are pressed against the sides of the column. The labellum is 6–9 mm (0.2–0.4 in) long, 2–4 mm (0.08–0.2 in) wide and curves downwards. It has scattered clusters of dark red and white hairs. Flowering occurs from April to July.

== Taxonomy and naming ==
Eriochilus helonomos was first formally described in 2006 by Stephen Hopper and Andrew Brown from a specimen collected near Denmark and the description was published in Nuytsia. The specific epithet (helonomos) is derived from an Ancient Greek word meaning "living in marshes", referring to the usual habitat of this species.

== Distribution and habitat ==
Swamp bunny orchid grows in swampy places and in seepage areas on granite outcrops. It is found between Dongara and Cape Riche.
