= Eriochilus valens =

Red-lipped bunny orchid

Scientific classification
- Kingdom: Plantae
- Clade: Embryophytes
- Clade: Tracheophytes
- Clade: Angiosperms
- Clade: Monocots
- Order: Asparagales
- Family: Orchidaceae
- Subfamily: Orchidoideae
- Tribe: Diurideae
- Genus: Eriochilus
- Species: E. valens

Binomial name
- Eriochilus valens Hopper & A.P.Br.

Synonyms
- Eriochilus valens N.Hoffman & A.P.Br. nom. inval.; Eriochilus valens Paczk. & A.R.Chapm. nom. inval.; Eriochilus valens J.R.Wheeler, N.G.Marchant & M.Lewington nom. inval.

Species of orchid

Eriochilus valens, commonly known as red-lipped bunny orchid, is a plant in the orchid family Orchidaceae and is endemic to Western Australia. It has a single egg-shaped leaf held above the ground and up to four small pink or white and pink flowers. It grows near winter-west swamps and usually only flowers after fire the previous summer.

== Description ==
Eriochilus valens is a terrestrial, perennial, deciduous, herb with an underground tuber and a single egg-shaped leaf 5–20 mm (0.2–0.8 in) long and 5–10 mm (0.2–0.4 in) wide. The leaf is held above the ground on a thin stalk 20–50 mm (0.8–2 in) high. Up to four white or pink flowers about 10 mm (0.4 in) long and wide are borne on a stem, 10–250 mm (0.4–10 in) tall. The dorsal sepal is egg-shaped with the narrower end towards the base, 6–8 mm (0.2–0.3 in) long and 2–3 mm (0.08–0.1 in) wide. The lateral sepals are 9–11 mm (0.35–0.43 in) long, 3–4 mm (0.1–0.2 in) wide and spread forwards. The petals are narrow spatula-shaped 5–7 mm (0.2–0.3 in) long, about 1 mm (0.04 in) wide and are held close to the dorsal sepal. The labellum is pink to red, 6–8 mm (0.2–0.3 in) long, about 3 mm (0.1 in) wide and has three lobes. The middle lobe is 2.5–3.5 mm (0.098–0.14 in) long and is fleshy with red bristles. Flowering occurs from March to May but is much more prolific after fire the previous summer.

== Taxonomy and naming ==
Eriochilus valens was first formally described in 2006 by Stephen Hopper and Andrew Brown from a specimen collected in the Bakers Junction Nature Reserve north of Albany and the description was published in Nuytsia. The specific epithet (valens) is a Latin word meaning "strong" or "vigorous", referring to the large labellum of this orchid.

== Distribution and habitat ==
Red-lipped bunny orchid grows in woodland and shrubland around winter-wet swamps, mainly between Walpole and Albany.

== Conservation ==
Eriochilus valens is classified as "not threatened" by the Western Australian Government Department of Parks and Wildlife.
