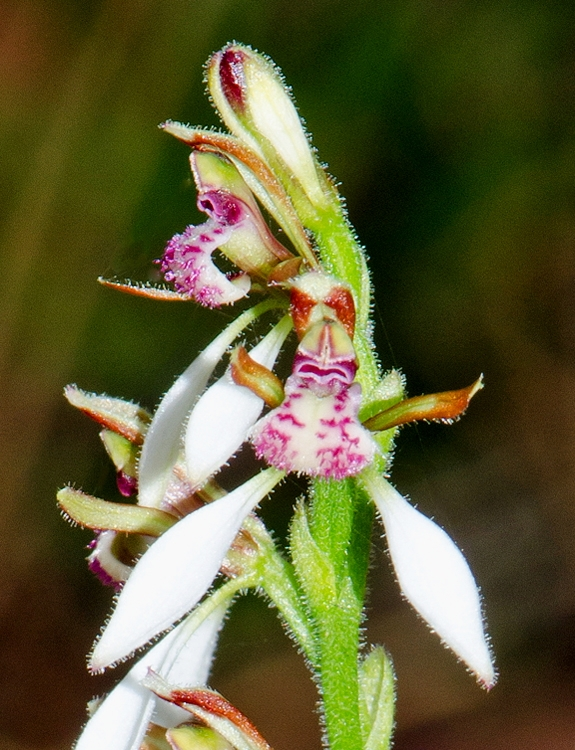
- Eriochilus dilatatus

Scientific classification
- Kingdom: Plantae
- Clade: Embryophytes
- Clade: Tracheophytes
- Clade: Angiosperms
- Clade: Monocots
- Order: Asparagales
- Family: Orchidaceae
- Subfamily: Orchidoideae
- Tribe: Diurideae
- Genus: Eriochilus
- Species: E. dilatatus
- Subspecies: E. d. subsp. dilatatus

Trinomial name
- Eriochilus dilatatus subsp. dilatatus Lindl.

Synonyms
- List: Eriochilus dilatatus subsp. Geraldton (A.S.George 2358); Eriochilus dilatatus subsp. magnus N.Hoffman & A.P.Br. nom. inval.; Eriochilus dilatatus subsp. magnus N.Hoffman & A.P.Br. nom. inval.; Eriochilus dilatatus subsp. magnus Paczk. & A.R.Chapm. nom. inval.; Eriochilus dilatatus subsp. magnus Hopper & A.P.Br.; Eriochilus dilatatus subsp. multiflorus N.Hoffman & A.P.Br. nom. inval.; Eriochilus dilatatus subsp. multiflorus N.Hoffman & A.P.Br. nom. inval.; Eriochilus dilatatus subsp. multiflorus Paczk. & A.R.Chapm. nom. inval.; Eriochilus dilatatus subsp. multiflorus (Lindl.) Hopper & A.P.Br.; Eriochilus dilatatus Lindl. var. dilatatus; Eriochilus dilatatus var. latifolius (Lindl.) Benth.; Eriochilus latifolius Lindl.; Eriochilus multiflorus Lindl.

= Eriochilus dilatatus subsp. dilatatus =

White bunny orchid

Subspecies of orchid

Eriochilus dilatatus subsp. dilatatus, commonly known as the white bunny orchid, is a plant in the orchid family Orchidaceae and is endemic to Western Australia. It has a single narrow leaf and up to seven greenish and white flowers with reddish or mauve markings. A widespread and common species, it grows in a range of habitats and flowers prolifically after fire.

== Description ==
Eriochilus dilatatus subsp. dilatatus is a terrestrial, perennial, deciduous, herb with an underground tuber and a single narrow egg-shaped, flattened, glabrous leaf, 29–90 mm (1–4 in) long, 4–15 mm (0.2–0.6 in) wide. The leaf is dark green and held above ground on a stalk up to 150 mm (6 in) long. Between two and seven flowers 14–18 mm (0.6–0.7 in) long and 10–15 mm (0.4–0.6 in) wide are borne on a flowering stem 100–300 mm (4–10 in) tall. The flowers are greenish with reddish markings, except for the lateral sepals which are white. The dorsal sepal is spatula-shaped, 8–10 mm (0.3–0.4 in) long and about 2 mm (0.08 in) wide. The lateral sepals are 13–15 mm (0.5–0.6 in) long and 3–4 mm (0.1–0.2 in) wide on a stalk about 3 mm (0.1 in) long. The petals are 7–9 mm (0.3–0.4 in) long and about 1 mm (0.04 in) wide. The labellum 8–10 mm (0.3–0.4 in) long, 3–4 mm (0.1–0.2 in) wide with three lobes and scattered clusters of red and white hairs. Flowering occurs from March to June.

== Taxonomy and naming ==
The white bunny orchid was first formally described in 1840 by John Lindley who gave it the name Eriochilus latifolius and published the description in A Sketch of the Vegetation of the Swan River Colony. In 1873, George Bentham changed the name to Eriochilus dilatatus var. latifolius and in 2006, Stephen Hopper and Andrew Brown changed the name to E. dilatatus subsp. dilatatus. The specific epithet (dilatatus) is a Latin word meaning "spread out", "enlarge", or "extend".

== Distribution and habitat ==
The swamp bunny orchid grows in woodland, shrubland and in shallow soil on granite outcrops between Dirk Hartog Island and Israelite Bay.

== Conservation ==
Eriochilus dilatatus subsp. dilatatus is classified as "not threatened" by the Western Australian Government Department of Parks and Wildlife.
