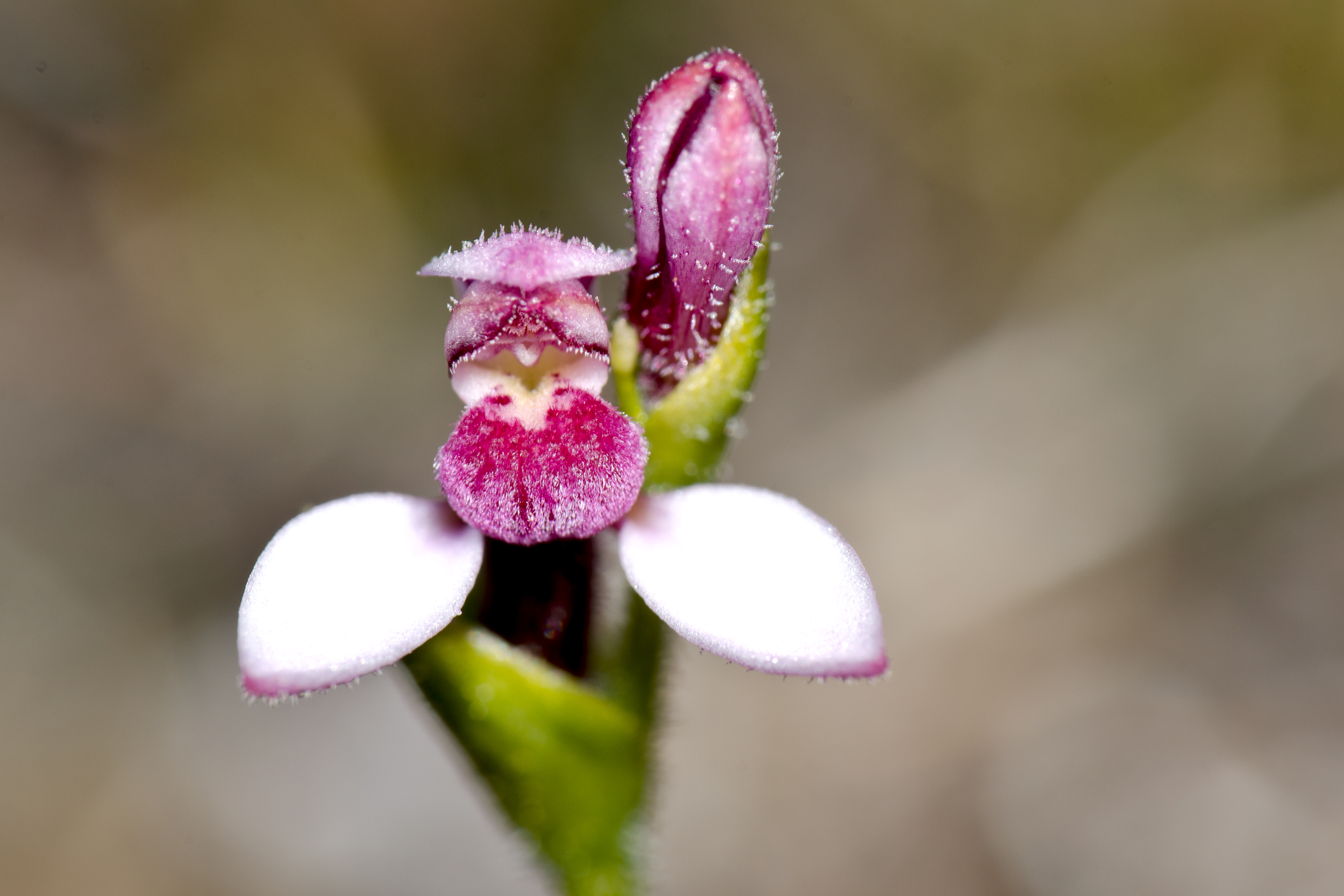

Scientific classification
- Kingdom: Plantae
- Clade: Tracheophytes
- Clade: Angiosperms
- Clade: Monocots
- Order: Asparagales
- Family: Orchidaceae
- Subfamily: Orchidoideae
- Tribe: Diurideae
- Genus: Eriochilus
- Species: E. scaber

Binomial name
- Eriochilus scaber Hopper & A.P.Br.

Synonyms
- Eriochilus lindleyi Endl.; Eriochilus scaber var. lindleyi (Endl.) Rchb.f.

= Eriochilus scaber =

Species of orchid

Eriochilus scaber is a plant in the orchid family Orchidaceae and is endemic to Western Australia. It has a single leaf and up to three small red, pink and white flowers. Two subspecies are recognised based on the shape of the leaf and its height above the ground.

== Description ==
Eriochilus scaber is a terrestrial, perennial, deciduous, herb with an underground tuber and a single glabrous, yellowish green leaf which is egg-shaped to almost round. Up to three red, pink and white flowers, about 10 mm (0.4 in) long and wide are borne on a thin green stem, 70–150 mm (3–6 in) tall. The dorsal sepal is egg-shaped with the narrower end towards the base, 6–8 mm (0.2–0.3 in) long and 2–3 mm (0.08–0.1 in) wide. The lateral sepals are broadly lance-shaped, 8–12 mm (0.3–0.5 in) long, 3–5 mm (0.1–0.2 in) wide and hairy on the lower side. The petals are narrow spatula-shaped, 5–8 mm (0.2–0.3 in) long, about 2 mm (0.08 in) wide and held close to the dorsal sepal. The labellum is 6–8 mm (0.2–0.3 in) long, about 3 mm (0.1 in) wide and has three lobes. The middle lobe is 2.5–3.5 mm (0.098–0.14 in) long and is fleshy with red bristles. Flowering occurs from July to September.

== Taxonomy and naming ==
Eriochilus scaber was first formally described in 1840 by John Lindley and the description was published in A Sketch of the Vegetation of the Swan River Colony. The specific epithet (scaber) is a Latin word meaning "rough" or "scurfy", referring to the surface of the labellum.

In 2006, Stephen Hopper and Andrew Phillip Brown described two subspecies of E. scaber in the journal Nuytsia, and the names are accepted by the Australian Plant Census:

- Eriochilus scaber Lindl. subsp. scaber, commonly known as pink bunny orchid, which has a more or less erect, egg-shaped leaf held 2–12 mm (0.08–0.5 in) above the ground.
- Eriochilus scaber subsp. orbifolius Hopper & A.P.Br., commonly known as round-leafed bunny orchid, which has an almost circular leaf held close to the ground.

== Distribution and habitat ==
This bunny orchid grows in winter-wet areas between Jurien Bay and the Cape Arid National Park. Subspecies orbifolius is restricted to a small area of old sand dunes near Walpole.

== Conservation ==
Eriochilus scaber subsp. scaber is classified as "not threatened" but subspecies orbifolius is classified as "Priority Two" by the Western Australian Government Department of Parks and Wildlife meaning that it is poorly known and from only one or a few locations.
