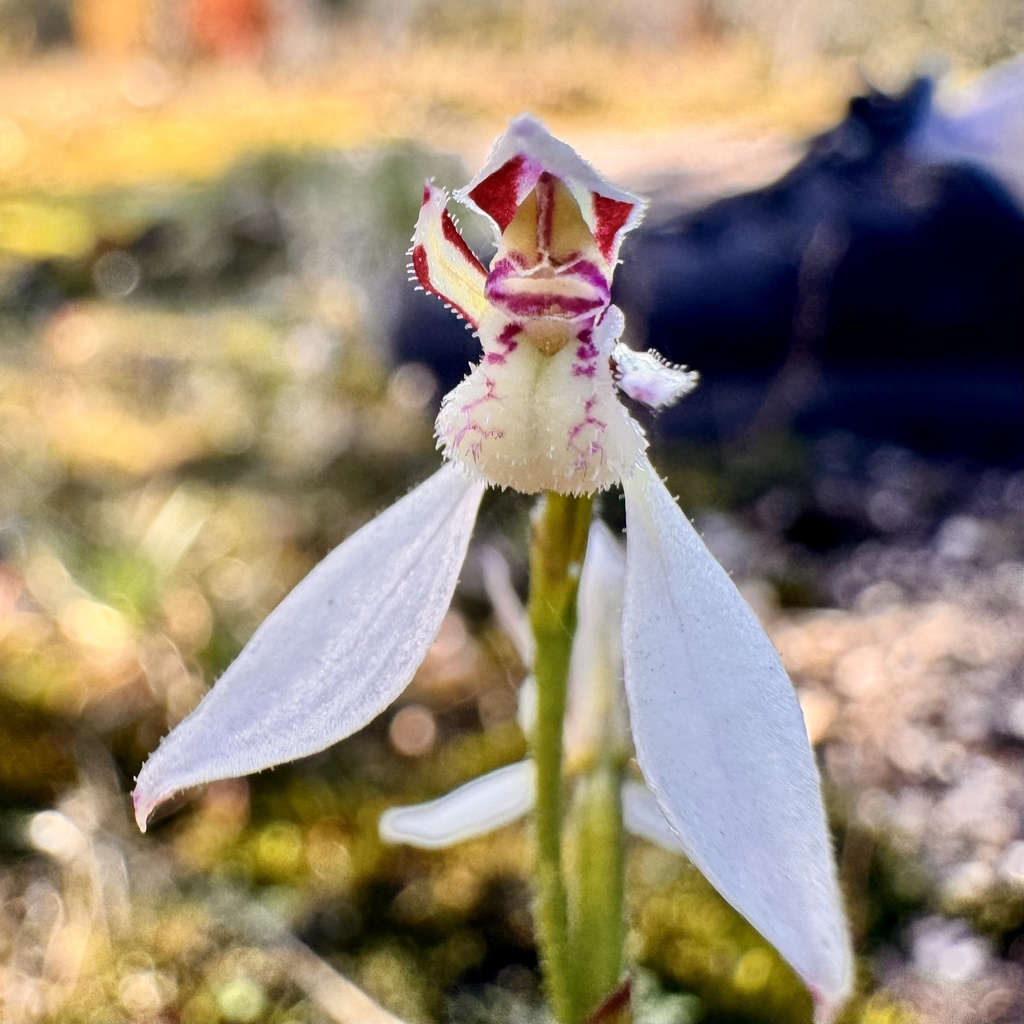
- Near Mount Lindesay National Park

Scientific classification
- Kingdom: Plantae
- Clade: Embryophytes
- Clade: Tracheophytes
- Clade: Angiosperms
- Clade: Monocots
- Order: Asparagales
- Family: Orchidaceae
- Subfamily: Orchidoideae
- Tribe: Diurideae
- Genus: Eriochilus
- Species: E. pulchellus

Binomial name
- Eriochilus pulchellus Hopper & A.P.Br.

Synonyms
- Eriochilus pulchellus N.Hoffman & A.P.Br. nom. inval.; Eriochilus pulchellus Paczk. & A.R.Chapm. nom. inval.; Eriochilus pulchellus J.R.Wheeler, N.G.Marchant & M.Lewington nom. inval.

= Eriochilus pulchellus =

Granite bunny orchid

Species of orchid

Eriochilus pulchellus, commonly known as granite bunny orchid, is a plant in the orchid family Orchidaceae and is endemic to Western Australia. It has a single egg-shaped leaf and up to ten small white flowers with red markings. A relatively common species, it grows in shallow soil on granite outcrops. Its fleshy leaf is held above the ground on a thin stalk.

== Description ==
Eriochilus pulchellus is a terrestrial, perennial, deciduous, herb with an underground tuber and a single, egg-shaped to oval leaf 5–15 mm (0.2–0.6 in) long and 3–8 mm (0.1–0.3 in) wide. The leaf is held above the ground on a thin stalk 20–70 mm (0.8–3 in) long. Up to ten white flowers with a few red markings, about 10 mm (0.4 in) long and 8 mm (0.3 in) wide are borne on a stem, 20–150 mm (0.8–6 in) tall. The dorsal sepal is egg-shaped with the narrower end towards the base, 7–9 mm (0.3–0.4 in) long and 2–3 mm (0.08–0.1 in) wide. The lateral sepals are 10–17 mm (0.4–0.7 in) long, 3–4 mm (0.1–0.2 in) wide and spread forwards. The petals are dull green with red tips and edges and are 7–9 mm (0.3–0.4 in) long and about 1 mm (0.04 in) wide. The labellum is 7–10 mm (0.3–0.4 in) long, about 3 mm (0.1 in) wide and has three lobes. The middle lobe is 4–5 mm (0.16–0.20 in) long and is fleshy with dark red bristles. Flowering occurs from April to May.

== Taxonomy and naming ==
Eriochilus pulchellus was first formally described in 2006 by Stephen Hopper and Andrew Brown from a specimen collected near Manjimup and the description was published in Nuytsia. The specific epithet (pulchellus) is the diminutive form of the Latin word meaning "beautiful", hence "beautiful little", referring to the flowers of this orchid.

== Distribution and habitat ==
Granite bunny orchid grows on granite outcrops between Windy Harbour and Albany, between Esperance and Israelite Bay and in the Darling Range near Perth.

== Conservation ==
Eriochilus pulchellus is classified as "not threatened" by the Western Australian Government Department of Parks and Wildlife.
