= Eriochilus paludosus =

Scientific classification
- Kingdom: Plantae
- Clade: Embryophytes
- Clade: Tracheophytes
- Clade: Angiosperms
- Clade: Monocots
- Order: Asparagales
- Family: Orchidaceae
- Subfamily: Orchidoideae
- Tribe: Diurideae
- Genus: Eriochilus
- Species: E. paludosus

Binomial name
- Eriochilus paludosus D.L.Jones & R.J.Bates

Species of orchid

Eriochilus paludosus is a plant in the orchid family Orchidaceae and is endemic to a restricted part of South Australia. It is a slender ground orchid with a ground-hugging, prostrate, egg-shaped leaf and one or two small, white flowers, sometimes tinged with pink, growing in fern thickets in peaty bogs.

== Description ==
Eriochilus paludosus has a ground-hugging, prostrate, egg-shaped leaf 7–20 mm (0.28–0.79 in) wide and 5–15 mm (0.20–0.59 in) wide that develops around flowering time. The leaf is mid-green above and pale green on the underside. One or two white flowers, 7–10 mm (0.28–0.39 in) wide, with pink tinges are borne on a thread-like spike up to 80–200 mm (3–8 in) tall. The dorsal sepal is spatula-shaped, 7–9 mm (0.28–0.35 in) long and about 2.5–30 mm (0.098–1.181 in) wide and forms a hood over the labellum. The lateral sepals are spread widely or nearly parallel, lance-shaped to linear, 10–13 mm (0.39–0.51 in) long and 2.5–3.0 mm (0.098–0.118 in) wide. The petals are spreading to obliquely erect, linear to sickle-shaped, 5–8 mm (0.20–0.31 in) long and about 1 mm (0.039 in) wide. The labellum is erect at the base, then strongly curved down, 3.5–4.0 mm (0.14–0.16 in) long and about 1.6 mm (0.063 in) wide and greenish with a smooth central groove. Flowering occurs in February and March.

== Taxonomy and naming ==
Eriochilus paludosus was first formally described in 2016 by David Jones and Robert J. Bates in Australian Orchid Review from specimens collected in a swamp about 5 km (3.1 mi) east of Myponga in 1994. The specific epithet (paludosus) means 'growing in marshes or swamps', "referring to its peat bog habitat".

== Distribution and habitat ==
This orchid grows among dense shrubs and fern thickets in peaty bogs, but is only known from the southern Mount Lofty Ranges especially on the Fleurieu Peninsula. It was also seen on the western end of Kangaroo Island before 1990.
