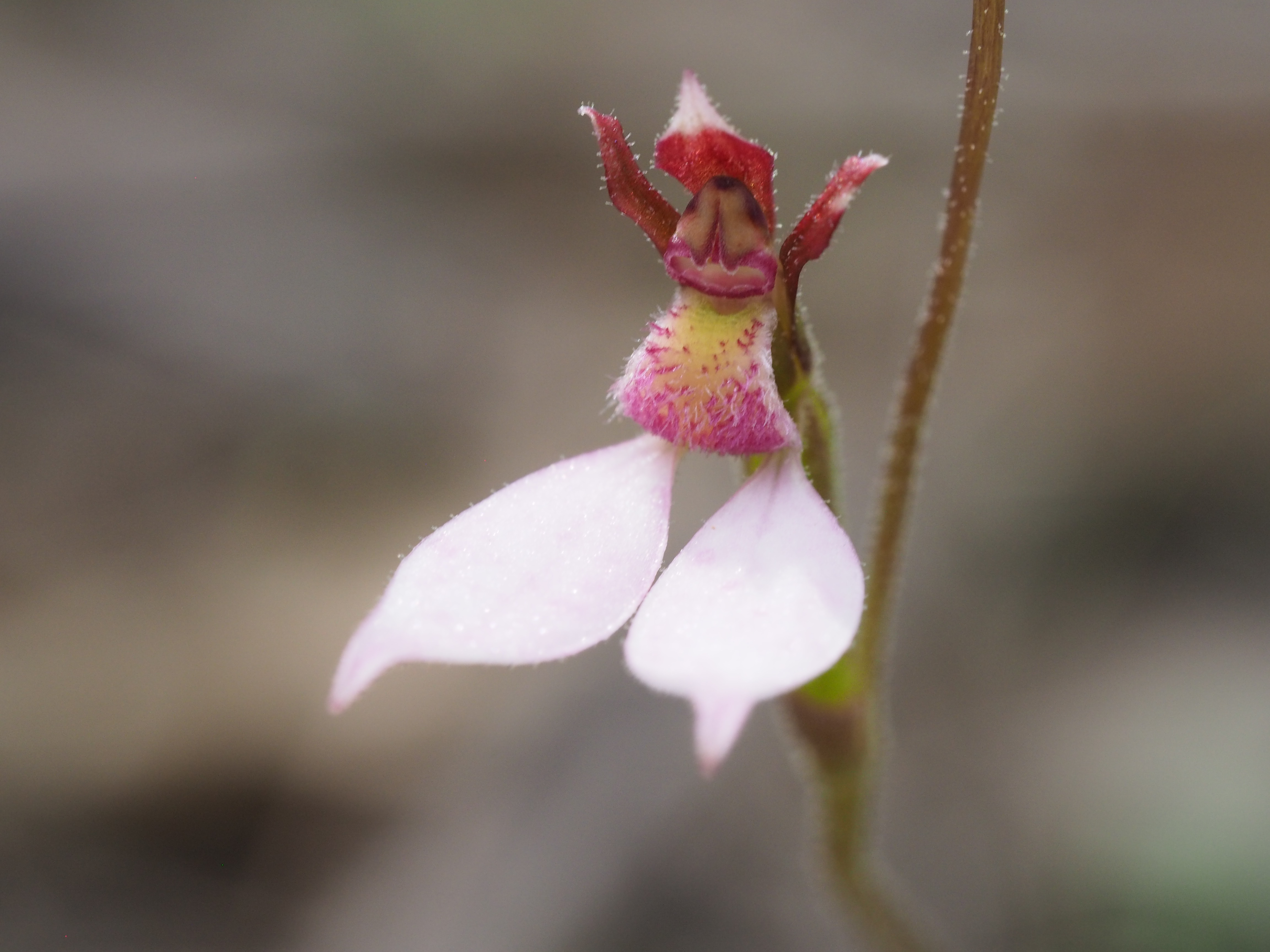
- Near Dangars Falls

Scientific classification
- Kingdom: Plantae
- Clade: Embryophytes
- Clade: Tracheophytes
- Clade: Angiosperms
- Clade: Monocots
- Order: Asparagales
- Family: Orchidaceae
- Subfamily: Orchidoideae
- Tribe: Diurideae
- Genus: Eriochilus
- Species: E. cucullatus

Binomial name
- Eriochilus cucullatus (Labill.) Rchb.f.

Synonyms
- Arethusa cucullata (Labill.) Sw.; Epipactis cucullata Labill.; Eriochilus auctumnalis F.Muell. orth. var.; Eriochilus autumnalis R.Br. nom. illeg.; Eriochilus cucculatus Domin orth. var.

= Eriochilus cucullatus =

Parson's bands

Species of orchid

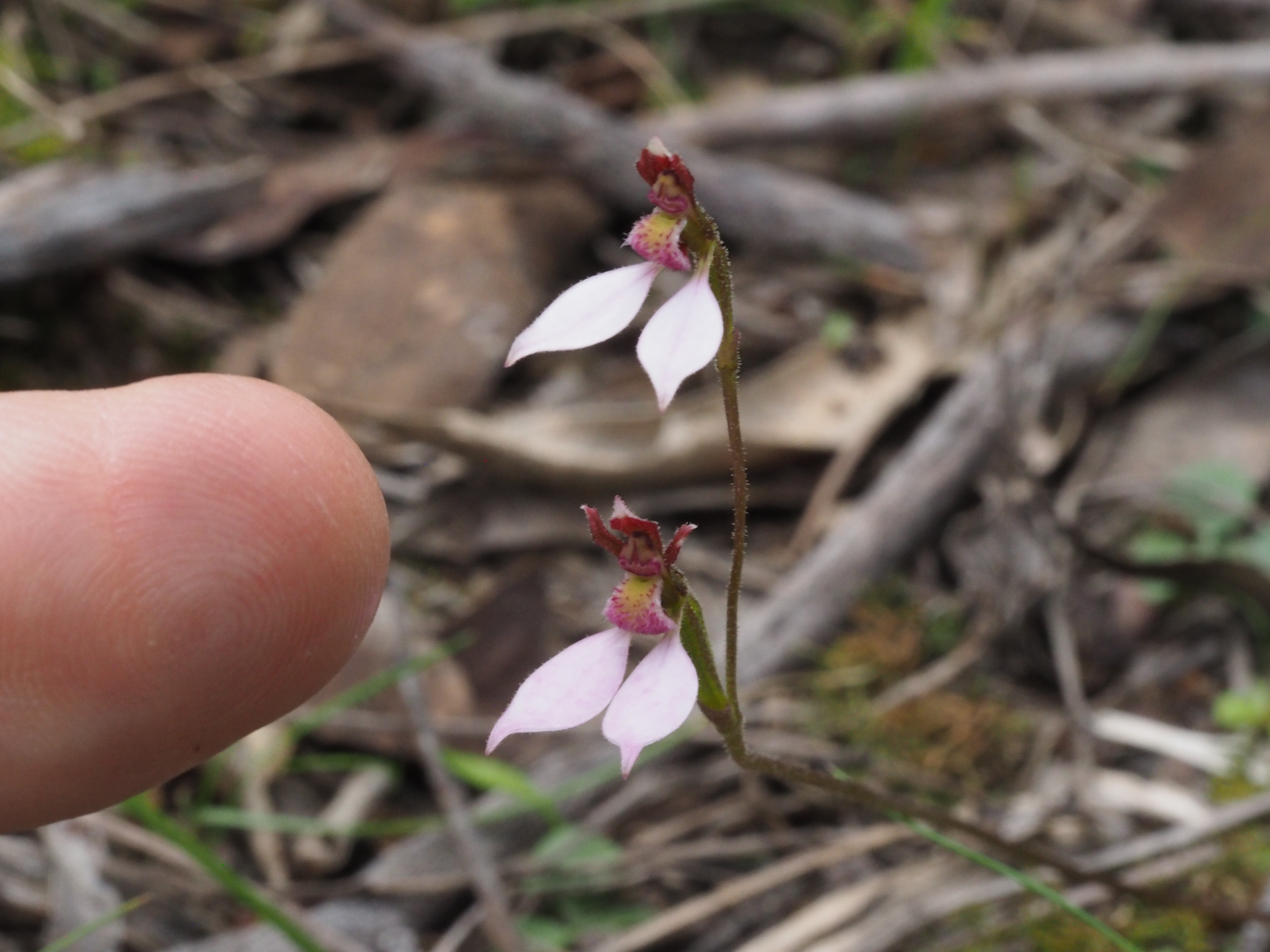
Flower with index finger for scale

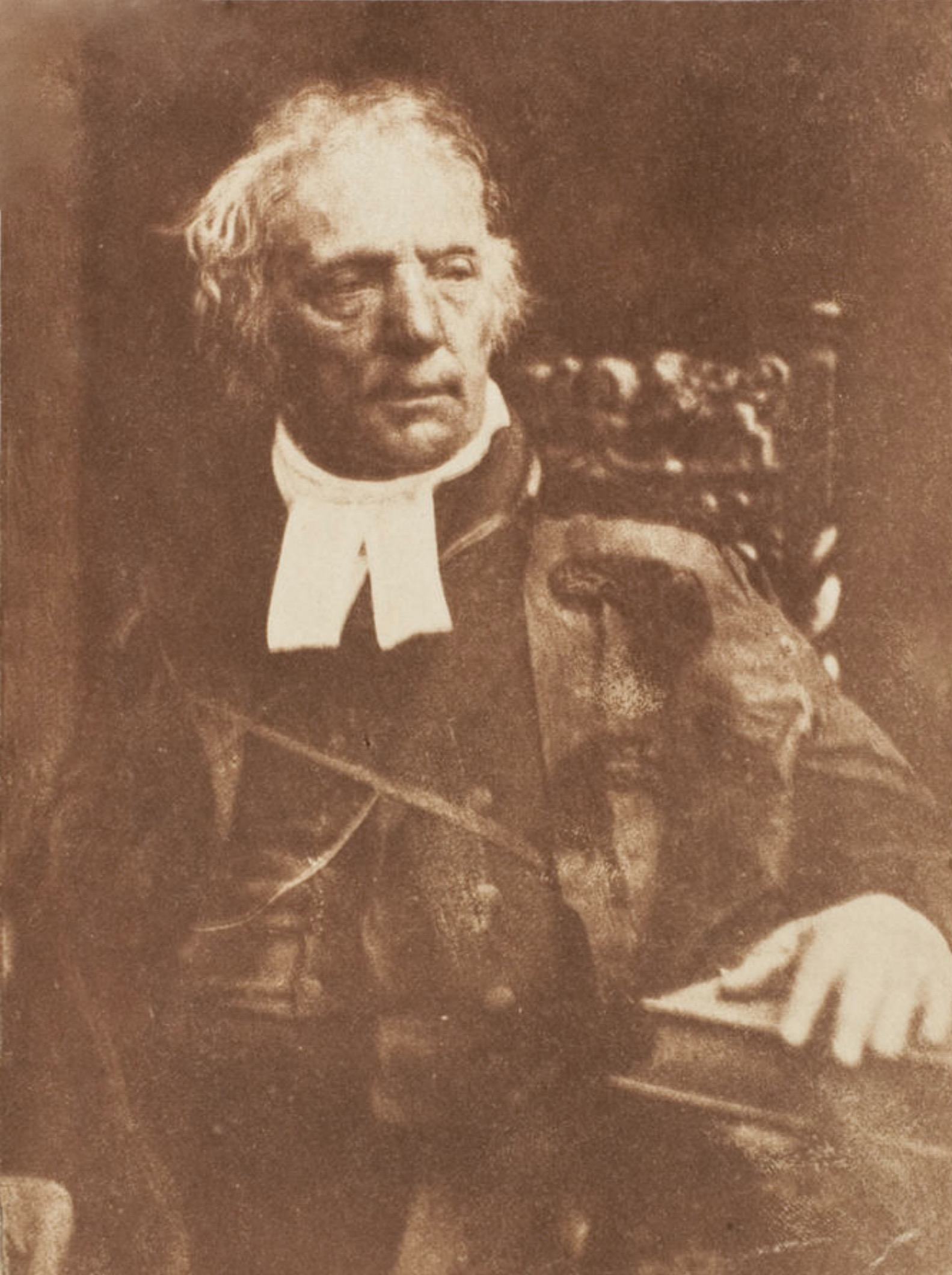
Thomas Chalmers with parson's bands

Eriochilus cucullatus, commonly known as parson's bands, or leafless parson's bands, is a plant in the orchid family Orchidaceae and is endemic to Australia. It is a common and widespread, slender ground orchid with a single leaf and up to five small white to pale pink flowers. It grows in all Australian states except Western Australia and the Northern Territory.

== Description ==
Eriochilus cucullatus is a terrestrial, perennial, deciduous, herb with an underground tuber. It has a single, egg-shaped, dark green, slightly rough and hairy leaf which is not fully developed until after flowering, when it is 15–35 mm (0.6–1 in) long and 7–12 mm (0.3–0.5 in) wide. Up to five white to pale pink flowers 15–20 mm (0.6–0.8 in) long and 12–15 mm (0.5–0.6 in) wide are borne on a slender spike, 100–250 mm (4–10 in) tall. The dorsal sepal is spoon-shaped to lance shaped with the narrower end towards its base, 5–8 mm (0.2–0.3 in) long, about 2 mm (0.08 in) wide and forms a hood over the column. The enlarged lateral sepals are 10–13 mm (0.4–0.5 in) long and 3–4 mm (0.1–0.2 in) wide and white to pale pink. The petals are reddish-green, 6–7 mm (0.2–0.3 in) long and about 1 mm (0.04 in) wide and slightly enlarged near the tip. The labellum is white, green or yellowish, 6–8 mm (0.2–0.3 in) long, about 3 mm (0.1 in) wide and fleshy with tufts of short red and white hairs. Flowering occurs from December to June.

== Taxonomy and naming ==
This orchid was first formally described in 1805 by Jacques Labillardière who gave it the name Epipactis cucullata and published the description in Novae Hollandiae Plantarum Specimen. In 1871 Heinrich Reichenbach changed the name to Eriochilus cucullatus. The specific epithet (cucullatus) is a Latin word meaning "hooded" and the common name, "parson's bands" refers to the white (or pink) lateral sepals resembling a clerical collar.

== Distribution and habitat ==
Parson's bands is widespread in Tasmania, in Victoria apart from the far north-west, eastern New South Wales as far west as Grenfell, south-east Queensland and south-east South Australia. It grows in a wide range of habitats, from grassland to forest and from coastal areas to subalpine zones.

== Use in horticulture ==
Eriochilus cucullatus is sometimes grown in pots by orchid enthusiasts but requires specialist techniques.
