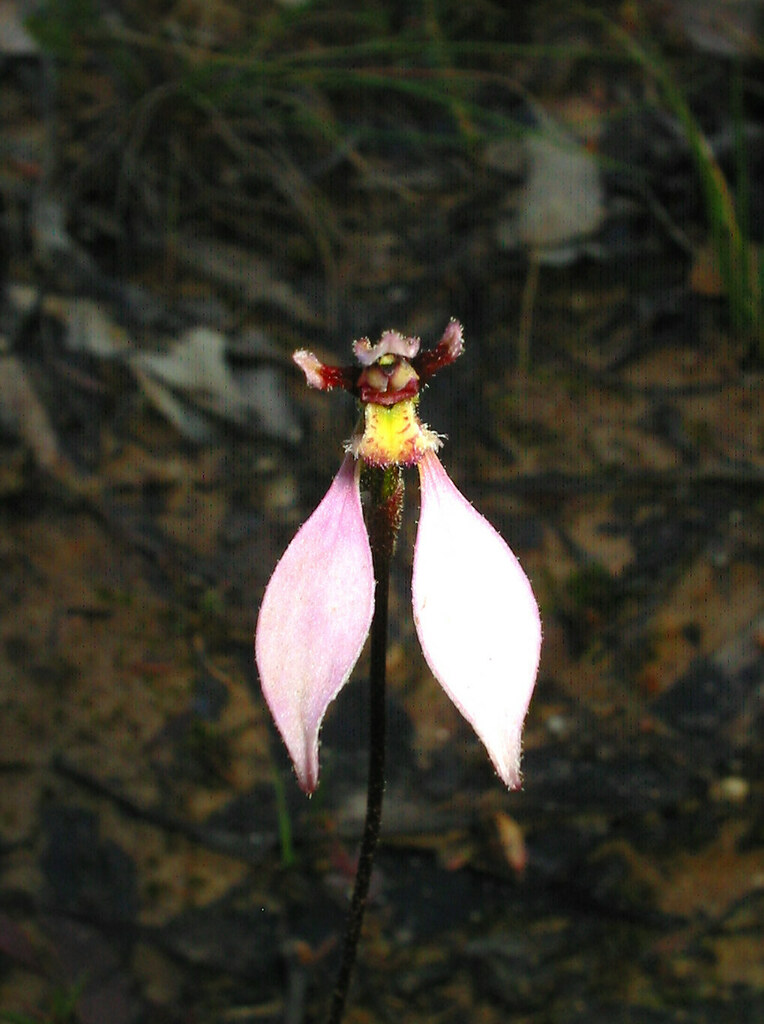
- Eriochilus petricola

Scientific classification
- Kingdom: Plantae
- Clade: Embryophytes
- Clade: Tracheophytes
- Clade: Angiosperms
- Clade: Monocots
- Order: Asparagales
- Family: Orchidaceae
- Subfamily: Orchidoideae
- Tribe: Diurideae
- Subtribe: Caladeniinae
- Genus: Eriochilus; R.Br.

= Eriochilus =

Bunny orchids

Genus of orchids

Eriochilus, commonly known as bunny orchids, is a genus of flowering plants in the orchid family, Orchidaceae that is endemic to Australia. Orchids in this genus are distinguished from those in the similar Caladenia by having a glabrous leaf and a densely woolly labellum. Species occur in south-west Western Australia, South Australia, Queensland, New South Wales, the Australian Capital Territory, Victoria, and Tasmania. Their common name alludes to their prominent ear-like lateral sepals.

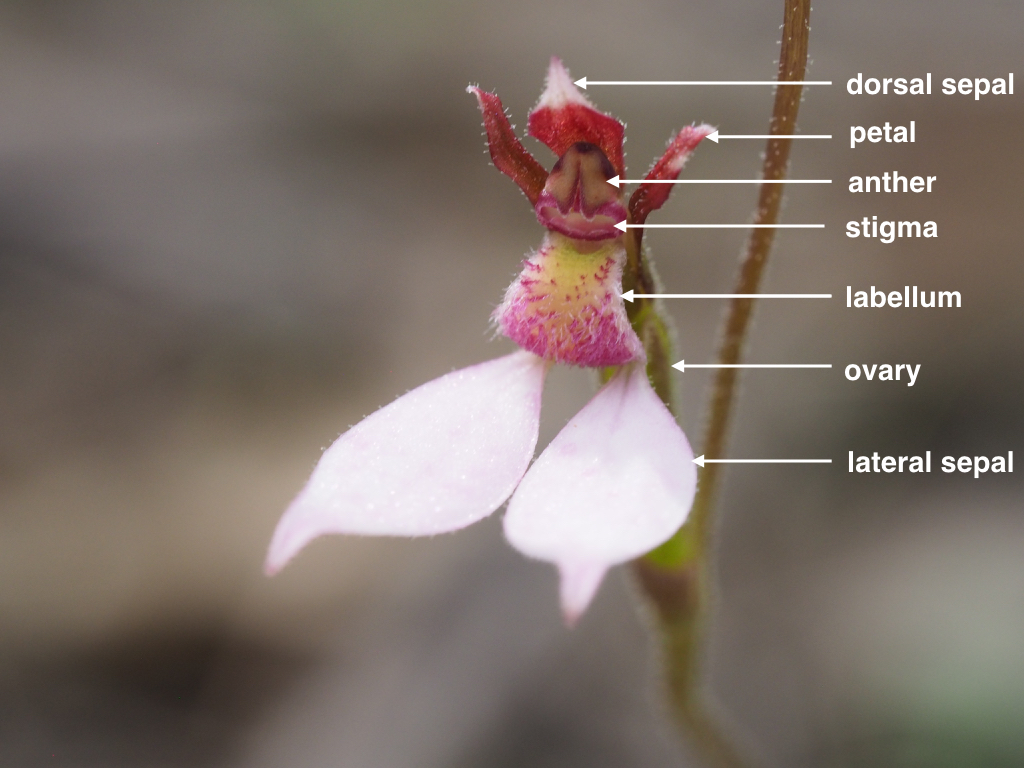
Labelled image of E. cucullatus

== Description ==
Orchids in the genus Eriochilus are terrestrial, perennial, deciduous, sympodial herbs usually with a few inconspicuous, fine roots and a roughly spherical, succulent tuber. Replacement tubers form at the end of short "droppers". There is a single, glabrous, egg-shaped to lance-shaped leaf either at the base, or in the middle of the flowering stem.

The inflorescence is a raceme with up to 25 resupinate flowers, each with a small bract at the base of its stalk. The dorsal sepal is smaller than the other two sepals, is dished and erect but curves forward to form a hood over the labellum. The lateral sepals are much longer, broader and more conspicuous than the dorsal sepal and are white to pink and spreading. As is usual in orchids, one petal is highly modified as the central labellum. The other two petals are usually smaller and narrower than the sepals and are either erect, spreading or curved backwards towards the ovary. The base of the labellum partly surrounds the lower part of the column forming a tube while the front is strongly curved downwards, covered with glandular hairs and often spotted. The sexual parts of the flower are fused to the column, which is erect, short, weakly curved and has narrow, wing-like structures. Bunny orchids flower from late winter to early summer, depending on species. The fruit that follows flowering is a non-fleshy, dehiscent capsule containing up to 500 seeds.

== Taxonomy and naming ==
The genus Eriochilus was first formally described in 1810 by Robert Brown and the description was published in Prodromus Florae Novae Hollandiae. The botanical name Eriochilus is derived from the Ancient Greek words ἔριον erion meaning "wool" and χεῖλος cheilos meaning lip referring to the hairy labellum.

== Distribution and habitat ==
Ten species of bunny orchids occur in Western Australia where they are found in a range of habitats from areas that are swampy in winter to dry inland woodlands. They occur from north of Kalbarri to Israelite Bay on the south coast. Three species are found in the south-east of South Australia, including the Eyre Peninsula and Yorke Peninsula. Two species are found in Victoria, three in New South Wales. Bunny orchids are also found in Queensland and Tasmania.

== Species list ==
The following is a list of species recognised by the Australian Plant Census as of August 2026.

- Eriochilus collinus D.L.Jones & R.J.Bates (S.A.)
  - Eriochilus collinus D.L.Jones & R.J.Bates subsp. collinus (S.A.)
  - Eriochilus collinus subsp. sericeus R.J.Bates (S.A.)
- Eriochilus cucullatus (Labill.) Rchb.f. – parson's bands (S.A., N.S.W., Vic., Qld. Tas.)
- Eriochilus dilatatus Lindl.
  - Eriochilus dilatatus subsp. brevifolius (Benth.) Hopper & A.P.Br. – blunt-leaved bunny orchid (W.A.)
  - Eriochilus dilatatus Lindl. subsp. dilatatus – white bunny orchid (W.A.)
- Eriochilus glareosus G.Brockman & C.J.French (W.A.)
- Eriochilus helonomos Hopper & A.P.Br. – swamp bunny orchid (W.A.)
- Eriochilus magenteus D.L.Jones (N.S.W., Vic., Tas.)
- Eriochilus paludosus D.L.Jones & R.J.Bates (S.A.)
- Eriochilus petricola D.L.Jones & M.A.Clem. (N.S.W., Vic., Qld.)
- Eriochilus pulchellus Hopper & A.P.Br. – granite bunny orchid (W.A.)
- Eriochilus scaber Lindl.
  - Eriochilus scaber subsp. orbifolia Hopper & Brown – round-leafed bunny orchid (W.A.)
  - Eriochilus scaber Lindl. subsp. scaber – pink bunny orchid (W.A.)
- Eriochilus tenuis Lindl. – slender bunny orchid (W.A.)
- Eriochilus valens Hopper & A.P.Br. – red-lipped bunny orchid (W.A.)
