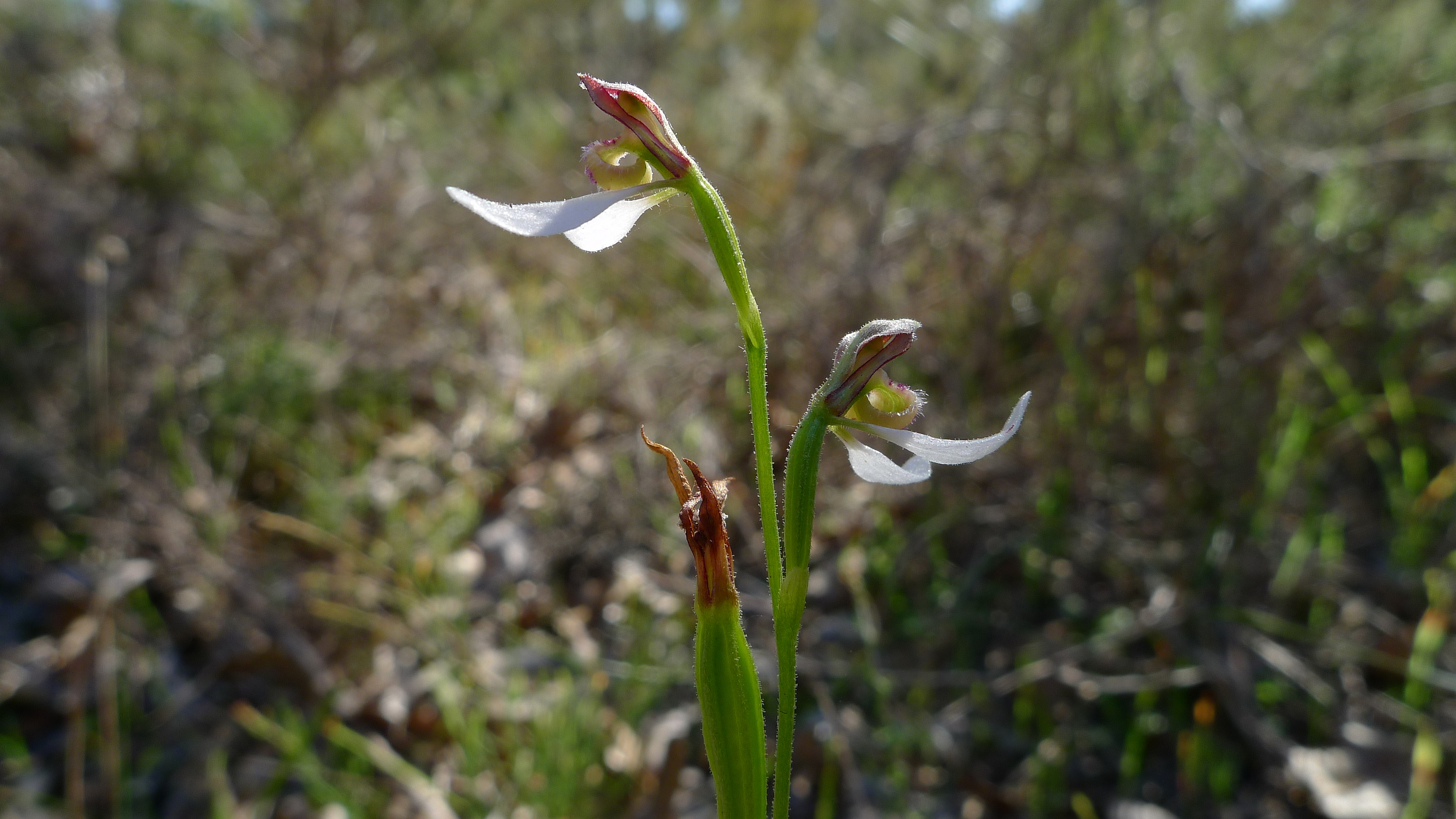
- In Swan View

Scientific classification
- Kingdom: Plantae
- Clade: Embryophytes
- Clade: Tracheophytes
- Clade: Angiosperms
- Clade: Monocots
- Order: Asparagales
- Family: Orchidaceae
- Subfamily: Orchidoideae
- Tribe: Diurideae
- Genus: Eriochilus
- Species: E. dilatatus

Binomial name
- Eriochilus dilatatus Lindl.

= Eriochilus dilatatus =

White bunny orchid

Species of orchid

Eriochilus dilatatus, commonly known as white bunny orchid, is a plant in the orchid family Orchidaceae and is endemic to Western Australia. It is a common and widespread, slender ground orchid with a single leaf and up to fifteen small white and greenish flowers with reddish or brownish markings and a hairy labellum.

== Description ==
Eriochilus dilatatus is a terrestrial, perennial, deciduous, herb with an underground tuber. Plants in flower have a single, egg-shaped leaf 15–75 mm (0.6–3 in) long and 5–15 mm (0.2–0.6 in) wide and attached about halfway up the flowering stem. Plants not in flower usually have a larger leaf on a stalk 60–150 mm (2–6 in) tall. Up to fifteen, usually more than three white and greenish flowers 12–18 mm (0.5–0.7 in) long and 10–12 mm (0.4–0.5 in) wide are borne on a flowering stem 100–350 mm (4–10 in) tall. The dorsal sepal is spatula-shaped, 5–10 mm (0.2–0.4 in) long and 2–4 mm (0.08–0.2 in) wide. The lateral sepals are white or cream-coloured, 7–20 mm (0.3–0.8 in) long and 2.5–4 mm (0.1–0.2 in) wide. The petals are greenish with brownish-red stripes, 5–8 mm (0.2–0.3 in) long, about 1 mm (0.04 in) wide and more or less erect. The labellum is greenish cream, 6–11 mm (0.2–0.4 in) long and 3–5 mm (0.1–0.2 in) wide with clusters of cream-coloured to pale purple hairs, and is prominently curved downwards. Flowering occurs between March and June with some subspecies flowering more prolifically after fire.

== Taxonomy, naming and distribution ==
Eriochilus dilatatus was first formally described in 1840 by John Lindley and the description was published in A Sketch of the Vegetation of the Swan River Colony. The specific epithet (dilatatus) is a Latin word meaning "spread out", "enlarge", or "extend", referring to the broad labellum and lateral sepals.

In 2006, Stephen Hopper and Andrew Phillip Brown described six subspecies of P. dilatatus, and the Australian Plant Census accepts the names of two of these subspecies:

- Eriochilus dilatatus subsp. brevifolius (Benth.) Hopper & A.P.Br. which grows in shrubland between Cataby and the Murchison River;
- Eriochilus dilatatus Lindl. subsp. dilatatus which grows in shrubland and woodland in near-coastal areas between Dirk Hartog Island and Israelite Bay;

== Ecology ==
Bunny orchids are pollinated by small native bees, attracted to nectar at the base of the labellum.

== Use in horticulture ==
Eriochilus species are generally easily grown in pots in a bushhouse or cool glasshouse. They need to be watered regularly when growing but kept dry when dormant during summer.
