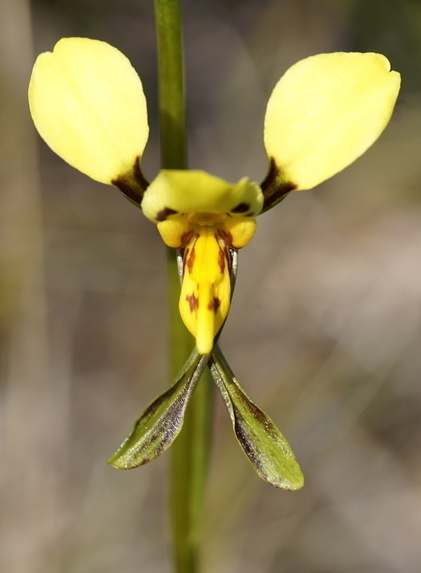
- Near Angourie

Scientific classification
- Kingdom: Plantae
- Clade: Embryophytes
- Clade: Tracheophytes
- Clade: Angiosperms
- Clade: Monocots
- Order: Asparagales
- Family: Orchidaceae
- Subfamily: Orchidoideae
- Tribe: Diurideae
- Genus: Diuris
- Species: D. unica

Binomial name
- Diuris unica D.L. Jones

= Diuris unica =

Species of orchid

Diuris unica is a species of orchid which is endemic to eastern Australia. It usually has only one grass-like leaf at its base and up to eight bright, lemon-yellow flowers with a few dark markings. It is similar to D. chrysantha but flowers much earlier than that species and has only a single leaf rather than two.

== Description ==
Diuris unica is a tuberous, perennial herb with a single, linear leaf, 150–280 mm (6–10 in) long, 3–7 mm (0.1–0.3 in) wide and folded lengthwise. Up to eight flowers 18–25 mm (0.7–1 in) wide are borne on a flowering stem 150–450 mm (6–20 in) tall. The flowers are bright lemon-yellow with a few dark markings at the base of the dorsal sepal and labellum. The dorsal sepal curves upwards and is egg-shaped, 7–10 mm (0.3–0.4 in) long and 5–7 mm (0.2–0.3 in) wide. The lateral sepals are egg-shaped to spatula-shaped with the narrower end towards the base, 8–18 mm (0.3–0.7 in) long, 2–3 mm (0.08–0.1 in) wide, held below the horizontal and parallel to each other or crossed. The petals are erect with an elliptical to almost round blade, 5–8 mm (0.2–0.3 in) long and wide on a blackish stalk 4–5 mm (0.16–0.20 in) long. The labellum is 7–9 mm (0.3–0.4 in) long and has three lobes. The centre lobe is egg-shaped to wedge-shaped, 6–8 mm (0.2–0.3 in) long, 5–8 mm (0.2–0.3 in) wide and the side lobes are oblong to broadly wedge-shaped, 3–4 mm (0.1–0.2 in) long and about 2 mm (0.08 in) wide. There are two thick, ridge-like calli 4–5 mm (0.16–0.20 in) long in the mid-line of the base of the labellum. Flowering occurs from July to September.

== Taxonomy and naming ==
Diuris unica was first formally described in 2006 by David Jones from a specimen he collected near Maryborough in 1986. The specific epithet (unica) is a Latin word meaning "only", "sole" or "singular", referring to the single leaf of this orchid.

== Distribution and habitat ==
This orchid grows in wallum and sandy heath in coastal and near-coastal districts in south-eastern Queensland and disjunctly in northern New South Wales.
