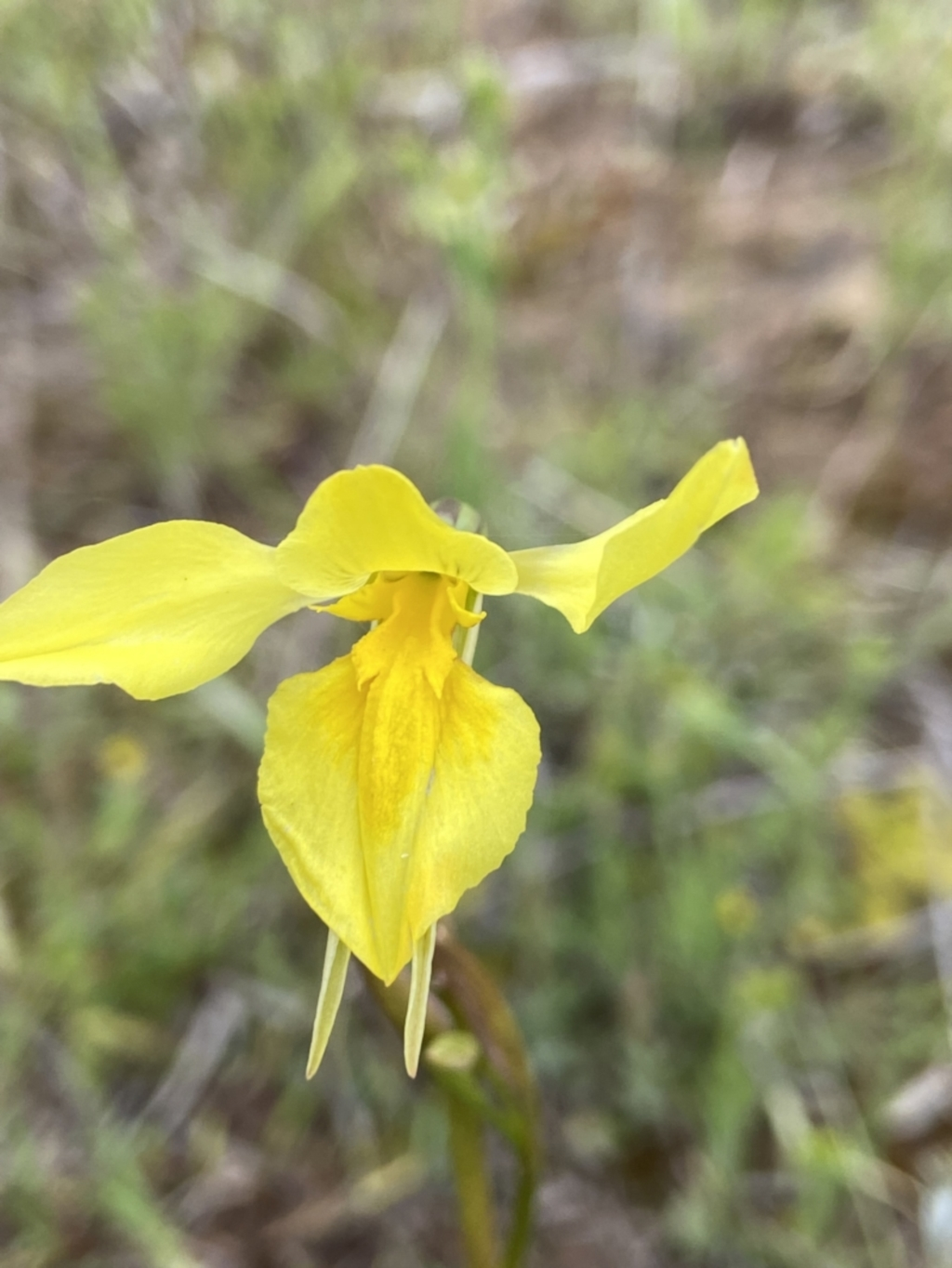
- In the Australian Capital Territory

Scientific classification
- Kingdom: Plantae
- Clade: Tracheophytes
- Clade: Angiosperms
- Clade: Monocots
- Order: Asparagales
- Family: Orchidaceae
- Subfamily: Orchidoideae
- Tribe: Diurideae
- Genus: Diuris
- Species: D. amabilis

Binomial name
- Diuris amabilis D.L.Jones

= Diuris amabilis =

Species of orchid

Diuris amabilis, commonly known as lovely moths, is a species of orchid that is endemic to south-eastern continental Australia. It has between four and eight grass-like leaves, a flowering stem with up to five yellow flowers with a few dark streaks, and a yellow to orange labellum. The flowers appear from late September to November.

== Description ==
Diuris behrii is a tuberous, perennial herb with between four and eight grass-like, linear to narrow linear leaves 100–250 mm (3.9–9.8 in) long and 3–6 mm (0.12–0.24 in) wide. Up to five yellow flowers are borne on a flowering stem 200–500 mm (7.9–19.7 in) tall, each flower on a pedicel 7–30 mm (0.28–1.18 in) long. The dorsal sepal is egg-shaped, up to 13–18 mm (0.51–0.71 in) long, 7–11 mm (0.28–0.43 in) and leans forwards at its lower half then erect. The lateral sepals are narrowly egg-shaped to spatula-shaped, 18–25 mm (0.71–0.98 in) long, 3.0–4.5 mm (0.12–0.18 in) wide, turned beneath the labellum and parallel to each other. The petals are nearly horizontal or droop, elliptic to narrowly egg-shaped, 17–27 mm (0.67–1.06 in) long, 2.0–2.5 mm (0.079–0.098 in) wide on a stalk 3–5 mm (0.12–0.20 in) long. The labellum has three lobes, the lateral lobes narrowly triangular, 3.0–3.5 mm (0.12–0.14 in) long and 1–2 mm (0.039–0.079 in) wide, the mid-lobe broadly egg-shaped, 16–20 mm (0.63–0.79 in) long and 11–15 mm (0.43–0.59 in) wide. There are two pimply orange calli 5–7 mm (0.20–0.28 in) long near the mid-line of the labellum. Flowering occurs from late September to November.

== Taxonomy and naming ==
Diuris amabilis was first formally described in 2019 by David Jones in Australian Orchid Review from a specimen collected near Bookham in 1992. The specific epithet (amabilis) means "lovely", referring to the flowers of this orchid.

== Distribution and habitat ==
Lovely orchid mostly grows in grassland, grassy woodland and forest, and around swamps at altitudes between 200 and 1,100 m (660 and 3,610 ft). It is found south from Orange in New South Wales to near Tooborac in central northern Victoria. There is a single record from the Australian Capital Territory. Records of Diuris behrii from these areas are now referrable to D. amabilis.
