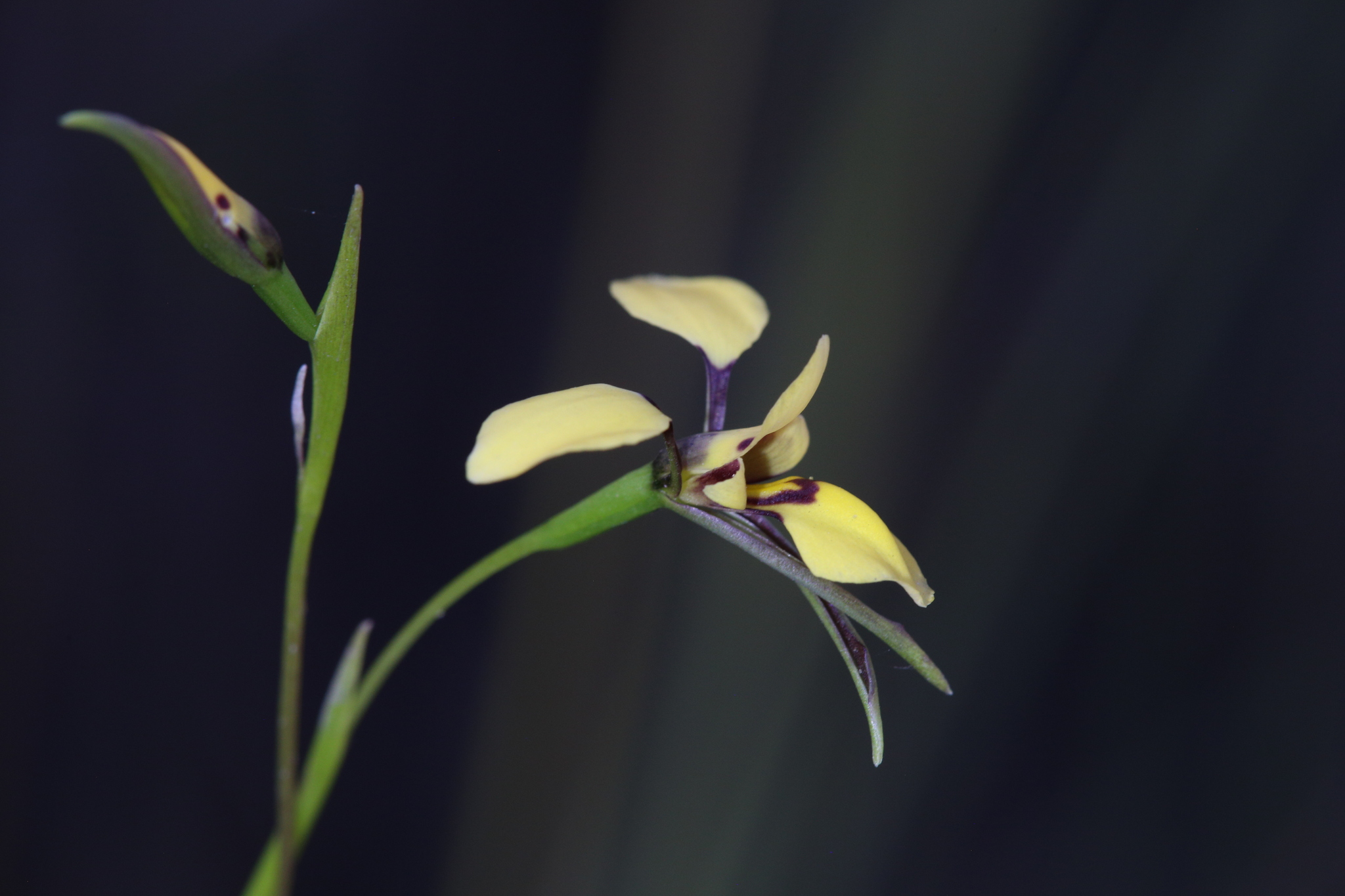

Conservation status
- Priority Two — Poorly Known Taxa (DEC)

Scientific classification
- Kingdom: Plantae
- Clade: Tracheophytes
- Clade: Angiosperms
- Clade: Monocots
- Order: Asparagales
- Family: Orchidaceae
- Subfamily: Orchidoideae
- Tribe: Diurideae
- Genus: Diuris
- Species: D. heberlei

Binomial name
- Diuris heberlei D.L.Jones

= Diuris heberlei =

Heberle's donkey orchid

Species of orchid

Diuris heberlei, commonly known as Heberle's donkey orchid, is a species of orchid which is endemic to the south-west of Western Australia. It has three to five linear leaves at its base and up to four bright yellow flowers with a reddish brown border around the labellum callus. It is found along the south coast and is one of the last Diuris species to flower in Western Australia.

== Description ==
Diuris heberlei is a tuberous, perennial herb with between three and five linear leaves at its base, each leaf 100–150 mm (4–6 in) long and 2–3 mm (0.08–0.1 in) wide. Up to five bright yellow flowers 30–35 mm (1.2–1.4 in) wide are borne on a flowering stem 200–500 mm (8–20 in) tall. The dorsal sepal is more or less erect, narrow egg-shaped with a tapered tip, 12–16 mm (0.5–0.6 in) long and 7–9 mm (0.3–0.4 in) wide. The lateral sepals are linear to sword-shaped, greenish brown, 18–24 mm (0.7–0.9 in) long, 4–5 mm (0.16–0.20 in) wide, turned downwards and parallel to each other. The petals are more or less erect or turned backwards, spread apart from each other, 11–16 mm (0.4–0.6 in) long and 8–11 mm (0.3–0.4 in) wide on a brownish or blackish stalk 6–8 mm (0.2–0.3 in) long. The labellum is 12–18 mm (0.5–0.7 in) long and has three lobes. The centre lobe is broadly egg-shaped, 10–13 mm (0.4–0.5 in) wide with a low ridge with brown markings near its base. The side lobes are egg-shaped, 6–10 mm (0.2–0.4 in) long and 4–7 mm (0.2–0.3 in) wide. There are two ridge-like calli about 8 mm (0.3 in) long near the mid-line of the base of the labellum and bordered with reddish brown. Flowering occurs between late December and February.

== Taxonomy and naming ==
Diuris heberlei was first formally described in 1991 by David Jones from a specimen collected near Nannarup, east of Albany, and the description was published in Australian Orchid Review. The specific epithet (heberlei), honours Ron Heberle, orchidologist and discoverer of this species .

== Distribution and habitat ==
Heberle's donkey orchid grows in winter-wet areas between sand dunes between Albany and Augusta in the Jarrah Forest and Warren biogeographic regions.

== Conservation ==
Diuris heberlei is classified as "Priority Two" by the Western Australian Government Department of Parks and Wildlife meaning that it is poorly known and from only one or a few locations.
