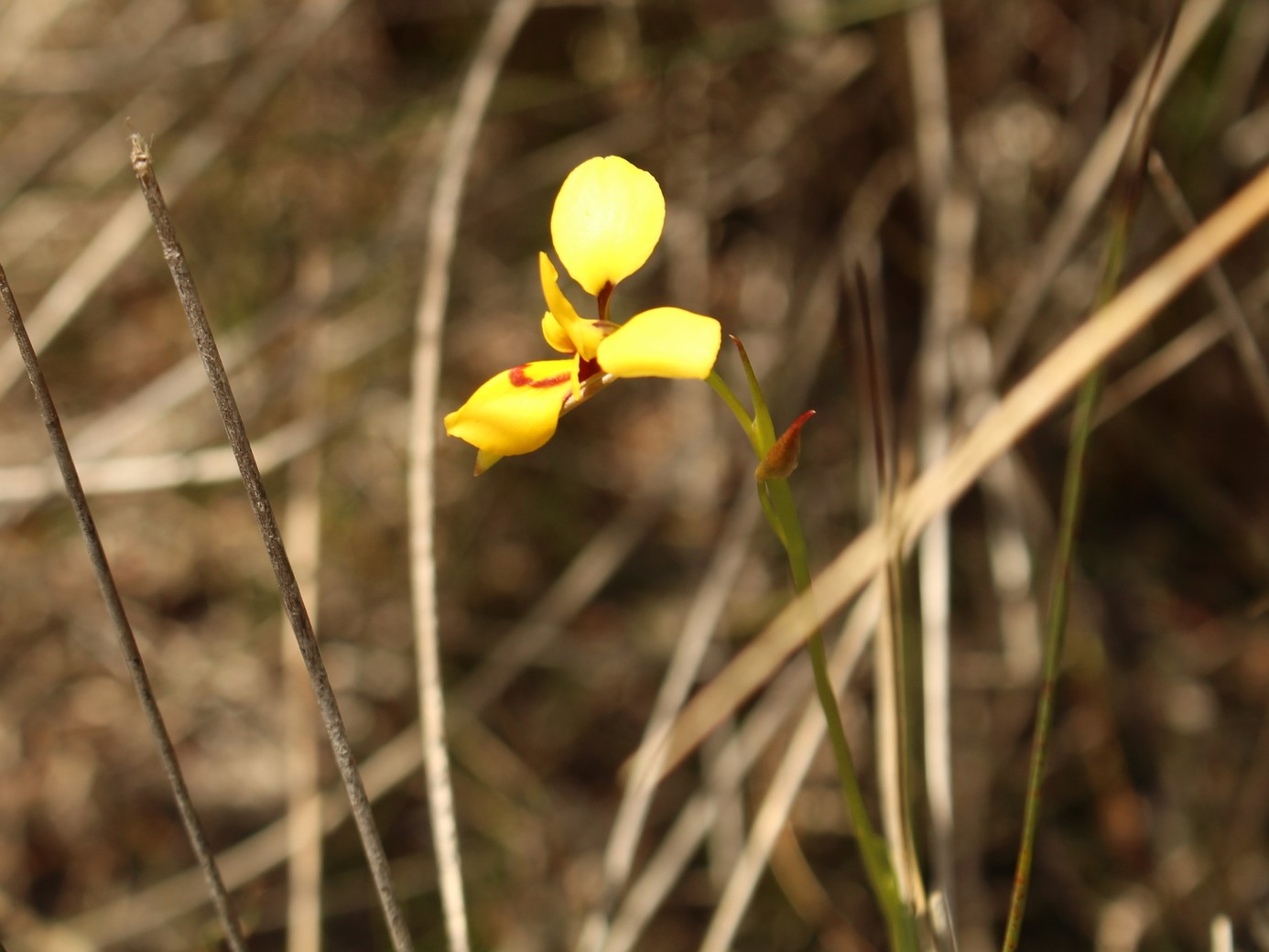

Scientific classification
- Kingdom: Plantae
- Clade: Tracheophytes
- Clade: Angiosperms
- Clade: Monocots
- Order: Asparagales
- Family: Orchidaceae
- Subfamily: Orchidoideae
- Tribe: Diurideae
- Genus: Diuris
- Species: D. emarginata

Binomial name
- Diuris emarginata R.Br.

= Diuris emarginata =

Late donkey orchid

Species of orchid

Diuris emarginata, commonly called the late donkey orchid, is a species of orchid which is endemic to the south-west of Western Australia. It has up to six leaves and a flowering stem with up to eight yellow flowers with brown markings but only after fires the previous summer.

== Description ==
Diuris emarginata is a tuberous, perennial herb with between three and six linear leaves 100–200 mm (4–8 in) long and 3–6 mm (0.1–0.2 in) wide. Between three and eight yellow flowers with brown markings, about 30 mm (1 in) long and 20–30 mm (0.8–1 in) wide are borne on a flowering stem 300–500 mm (10–20 in) tall. The dorsal is erect, tapering, 11–13 mm (0.4–0.5 in) long and 5–7 mm (0.2–0.3 in) wide. The lateral sepals are 13–16 mm (0.5–0.6 in) long, 3–4 mm (0.1–0.2 in) wide and project forwards. The petals are more or less erect or spread apart from each other, 9–12 mm (0.4–0.5 in) long and 6–8 mm (0.2–0.3 in) wide on a blackish stalk 5–6 mm (0.2–0.2 in) long. The labellum is 11–14 mm (0.4–0.6 in) long, turns slightly downwards and has three lobes. The centre lobe is narrow egg-shaped, 11–13 mm (0.4–0.5 in) long and 6–8 mm (0.2–0.3 in) wide and the side lobes are 5–8 mm (0.2–0.3 in) long, 2–3 mm (0.08–0.1 in) wide and spread apart from each other. There are two callus ridges 5–6 mm (0.20–0.24 in) long near the mid-line of the labellum and outlined in brownish red. Flowering occurs from November to January, but only after fire the previous summer.

== Taxonomy and naming ==
Diuris emarginata was first formally described in 1810 by Robert Brown and the description was published in Prodromus Florae Novae Hollandiae et Insulae Van Diemen. The specific epithet (emarginata) is a Latin word meaning "without margin" or "notched at the apex".

== Distribution and habitat ==
The late donkey orchid occurs in winter-wet areas mainly between Augusta and Albany in the Jarrah Forest and Warren biogeographic regions.

== Conservation ==
Diuris emarginata is classified as "not threatened" by the Western Australian Government Department of Parks and Wildlife.
