= Diuris exitela =

Scientific classification
- Kingdom: Plantae
- Clade: Tracheophytes
- Clade: Angiosperms
- Clade: Monocots
- Order: Asparagales
- Family: Orchidaceae
- Subfamily: Orchidoideae
- Tribe: Diurideae
- Genus: Diuris
- Species: D. exitela

Binomial name
- Diuris exitela D.L.Jones

Species of orchid

Diuris exitela, commonly called the Mount Moffat doubletail, is a species of orchid which is endemic to central western Queensland. It has two linear leaves at its base, up to twelve bright yellow flowers with dark brown markings and grows on sandstone cliffs and ridges.

== Description ==
Diuris exitela is a tuberous, perennial herb with two linear leaves 150–400 mm (6–20 in) long, 8–12 mm (0.3–0.5 in) wide and folded lengthwise. Between seven and twelve bright yellow flowers with dark brown markings, 20–25 mm (0.8–1 in) wide and leaning downwards are borne on a flowering stem 300–700 mm (10–30 in) tall. The dorsal sepal projects forward and is egg-shaped, 9–12 mm (0.4–0.5 in) long and 5–7 mm (0.2–0.3 in) wide and forms a hood over the rest of the flower. The lateral sepals are linear to lance-shaped with the narrower end towards the base, green and purple-brown, 10–16 mm (0.4–0.6 in) long, 1–2 mm (0.04–0.08 in) wide, turned downwards and usually crossed over each other. The petals are held horizontally or droop with an elliptic blade 9–13 mm (0.4–0.5 in) long and 5–8 mm (0.2–0.3 in) wide on a green to purplish stalk 4–6 mm (0.16–0.24 in) long. The labellum is 10–15 mm (0.4–0.6 in) long and has three lobes. The centre lobe is egg-shaped, 9–12 mm (0.4–0.5 in) long and 6–8 mm (0.2–0.3 in) wide and the side lobes are linear, purplish-brown, about 2 mm (0.08 in) long and 1 mm (0.04 in) wide. There are two ridge-like calli about 4.5 mm (0.18 in) long near the base of the mid-line of the base of the labellum. Flowering occurs in September and October.

== Taxonomy and naming ==
Diuris exitela was first formally described in 1991 by David Jones from a specimen collected on Mount Moffat and the description was published in Australian Orchid Research. The specific epithet (exitela) is derived from the Ancient Greek word exitelos meaning "lessening", "fading" or "weakening", referring to the colour of the flowers which fades quickly from bright yellow to pale yellow as they age.

== Distribution and habitat ==
The Mount Moffat doubletail grows mainly on sandstone cliffs and ridges but also between sandstone boulders in woodland and is found on Mount Moffat and in Carnarvon Gorge in central western Queensland.
