= Diuris cuneata =

Scientific classification
- Kingdom: Plantae
- Clade: Embryophytes
- Clade: Tracheophytes
- Clade: Spermatophytes
- Clade: Angiosperms
- Clade: Monocots
- Order: Asparagales
- Family: Orchidaceae
- Subfamily: Orchidoideae
- Tribe: Diurideae
- Genus: Diuris
- Species: D. cuneata

Binomial name
- Diuris cuneata Fitzg.

Synonyms
- Diuris punctata var. longissima Benth.

Species of orchid

Diuris cuneata is a species of orchid whose name is accepted by the Plants of the World Online but regarded as a synonym of Diuris dendrobioides by Australian authorities. It was first formally described in 1888 by Robert D. FitzGerald from a specimen collected near Cootamundra by Walter Scott Campbell and the description was published in Fitgerald's book Australian Orchids.
