= Diuris secundiflora =

One-sided donkey orchid

Scientific classification
- Kingdom: Plantae
- Clade: Embryophytes
- Clade: Tracheophytes
- Clade: Angiosperms
- Clade: Monocots
- Order: Asparagales
- Family: Orchidaceae
- Subfamily: Orchidoideae
- Tribe: Diurideae
- Genus: Diuris
- Species: D. secundiflora

Binomial name
- Diuris secundiflora Fitzg.

Species of orchid

Diuris secundiflora, commonly known as one-sided donkey orchid, is a poorly-known species of orchid that is endemic to New South Wales. It has a single grass-like leaf and up to eight yellow flowers that are sometimes spotted and are all arranged on one side of the flowering stem.

== Description ==
Diuris secundiflora is a tuberous, perennial herb with a single leaf about 90 mm (4 in) long, 3 mm (0.1 in) wide and folded lengthwise. Between two and eight yellow flowers about 15 mm (0.6 in) wide are borne on one side of a flowering stem about 500 mm (20 in) tall. The dorsal sepal curves backwards, 8–10 mm (0.3–0.4 in) long, about 6 mm (0.2 in) wide and egg-shaped to spatula-shaped. The lateral sepals are linear, 30–40 mm (1–2 in) long, about 1.5 mm (0.06 in) wide and turned downwards. The petals spread widely or are more or less erect, egg-shaped, 6–7 mm (0.2–0.3 in) long and about 5 mm (0.2 in) wide on a dark reddish brown stalk 8–9 mm (0.31–0.35 in) long. The labellum is about 6 mm (0.2 in) long and has three lobes. The centre lobe is fan-shaped, 4 mm (0.16 in) long and 6 mm (0.24 in) wide with a central ridge. The side lobes are about 2 mm (0.08 in) long and less than 1 mm (0.04 in) wide. There are two thick callus ridges 2–3 mm (0.08–0.1 in) long near the mid-line of the labellum. Flowering occurs in October and November.

== Taxonomy and naming ==
Diuris secundiflora was first formally described in 1878 by Robert FitzGerald and the description was published in his book Australian Orchids.

== Distribution ==
One-sided donkey orchid is only known from the type location near the Macleay River "growing in a small cluster on an open bank".
