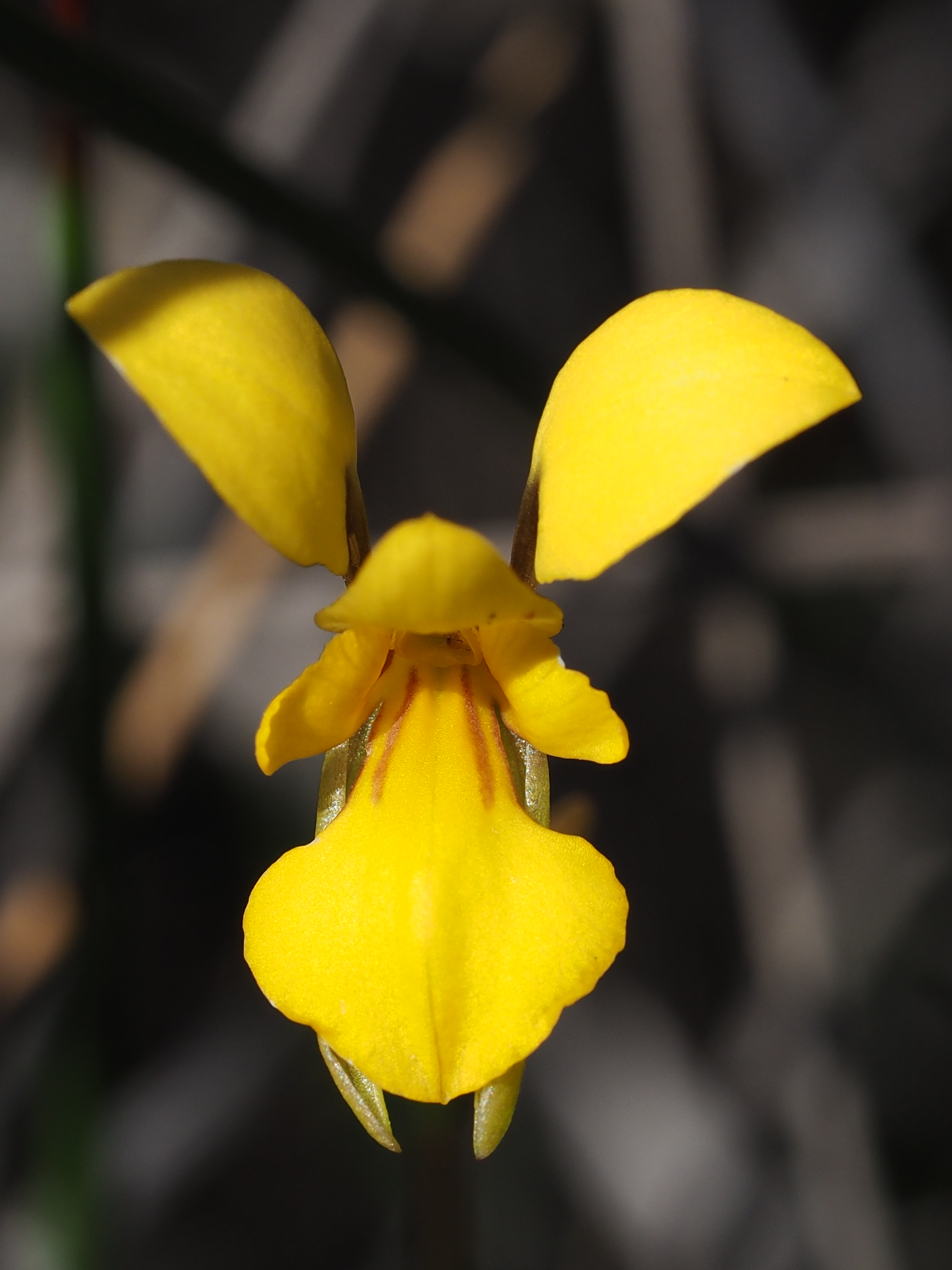
- Near Madfish Bay in the William Bay National Park

Scientific classification
- Kingdom: Plantae
- Clade: Embryophytes
- Clade: Tracheophytes
- Clade: Angiosperms
- Clade: Monocots
- Order: Asparagales
- Family: Orchidaceae
- Subfamily: Orchidoideae
- Tribe: Diurideae
- Genus: Diuris
- Species: D. laevis

Binomial name
- Diuris laevis Fitzg.

= Diuris laevis =

Nanny goat orchid

Species of orchid

Diuris laevis, commonly known as the nanny goat orchid, is a species of orchid that is endemic to the south-west of Western Australia. It has between four and eight leaves and up to six pale yellow flowers which usually have reddish-brown markings. It has an unusually short dorsal sepal and wide labellum and is relatively common between Bunbury and Albany.

== Description ==
Diuris laevis is a tuberous, perennial herb with between four and eight spirally twisted leaves 50–120 mm (2–5 in) long and 2–3 mm (0.08–0.1 in) wide. Up to eight pale yellow flowers usually with reddish brown markings, 20–35 mm (0.8–1 in) long and 18–30 mm (0.7–1 in) wide are borne on a flowering stem 200–350 mm (8–10 in) tall. The dorsal sepal is angled upwards, 9–12 mm (0.4–0.5 in) long, 4–6 mm (0.16–0.24 in) wide and tapered. The lateral sepals project forwards 17–22 mm (0.7–0.9 in) long, 3–4 mm (0.1–0.2 in) wide. The petals are erect, spread apart from each other, egg-shaped, 8–10 mm (0.3–0.4 in) long and 7–9 mm (0.3–0.4 in) wide on a brown stalk 4–5 mm (0.16–0.20 in) long. The labellum is 13–16 mm (0.5–0.6 in) long and has three lobes. The centre lobe is broadly egg-shaped, 11–13 mm (0.4–0.5 in) long and 12–14 mm (0.5–0.6 in) wide. The side lobes are 6–8 mm (0.2–0.3 in) long and 3–4 mm (0.1–0.2 in) wide with toothed edges. There are two flattened callus ridges 4–5 mm (0.16–0.20 in) long near the mid-line of the labellum. Flowering occurs in October and November, more prolifically after fire.

== Taxonomy and naming ==
Diuris laevis was first formally described in 1882 by Robert FitzGerald and the description was published in The Gardeners' Chronicle. The specific epithet (laevis) is a Latin word meaning "smooth", "polished" or "bald".

== Distribution and habitat ==
The nanny goat orchid grows in winter-wet areas and in swamps, often in large numbers between Bunbury and Albany in the Esperance Plains, Jarrah Forest and Warren biogeographic regions.

== Conservation ==
Diuris laevis is classified as "not threatened" by the Western Australian Government Department of Parks and Wildlife.
