= Diuris immaculata =

Little Esperance bee orchid

Scientific classification
- Kingdom: Plantae
- Clade: Tracheophytes
- Clade: Angiosperms
- Clade: Monocots
- Order: Asparagales
- Family: Orchidaceae
- Subfamily: Orchidoideae
- Tribe: Diurideae
- Genus: Diuris
- Species: D. immaculata

Binomial name
- Diuris immaculata D.L.Jones

Species of orchid

Diuris immaculata, commonly known as the little Esperance bee orchid, is a rare species of orchid that is endemic to the south-west of Western Australia. It has between four and six leaves and up to three golden yellow flowers without markings. It is only known from near Esperance.

== Description ==
Diuris immaculata is a tuberous, perennial herb with between four and six linear to lance-shaped leaves 40–80 mm (2–3 in) long, 1–3 mm (0.04–0.1 in) wide and folded lengthwise. Up to three golden yellow flowers without markings, 15–18 mm (0.6–0.7 in) long and 9–12 mm (0.4–0.5 in) wide are borne on a flowering stem 80–300 mm (3–10 in) tall. The dorsal sepal is egg-shaped, 9–14 mm (0.4–0.6 in) long, 5–7 mm (0.2–0.3 in) wide and curves upwards. The lateral sepals are oblong to egg-shaped with the narrower end towards the base, 10–16 mm (0.4–0.6 in) long, 2.5–4 mm (0.1–0.2 in) wide, held below the horizontal and parallel to each other. The petals are held above horizontal, egg-shaped to elliptic, 7–12 mm (0.3–0.5 in) long and 6–8 mm (0.2–0.3 in) wide on a green stalk 3–4 mm (0.1–0.2 in) long. The labellum is 10–13 mm (0.4–0.5 in) long, turns slightly downwards and has three lobes. The centre lobe is broadly egg-shaped to wedge-shaped, 8–11 mm (0.3–0.4 in) long and 7–11 mm (0.3–0.4 in) wide. The side lobes are egg-shaped with the narrower end towards the base, 4.5–7 mm (0.2–0.3 in) long and 2.5–4 mm (0.1–0.2 in) wide. There are two callus ridges 4.5 mm (0.2 in) long spreading apart from each other, near the mid-line of the labellum. Flowering occurs from September to November after fire.

== Taxonomy and naming ==
Diuris immaculata was first formally described in 2006 by David Jones from a specimen collected north-east of Esperance and the description was published in Australian Orchid Research. The specific epithet (immaculata) is a Latin word meaning "unstained" or "unspotted", referring to the pure yellow colour of the flowers of this orchid.

== Distribution and habitat ==
The little Esperance bee orchid grows in winter-wet areas from north-east of Esperance to the Cape Arid National Park.

== Conservation ==
Diuris immaculata is classified as "not threatened" by the Western Australian Government Department of Parks and Wildlife,
