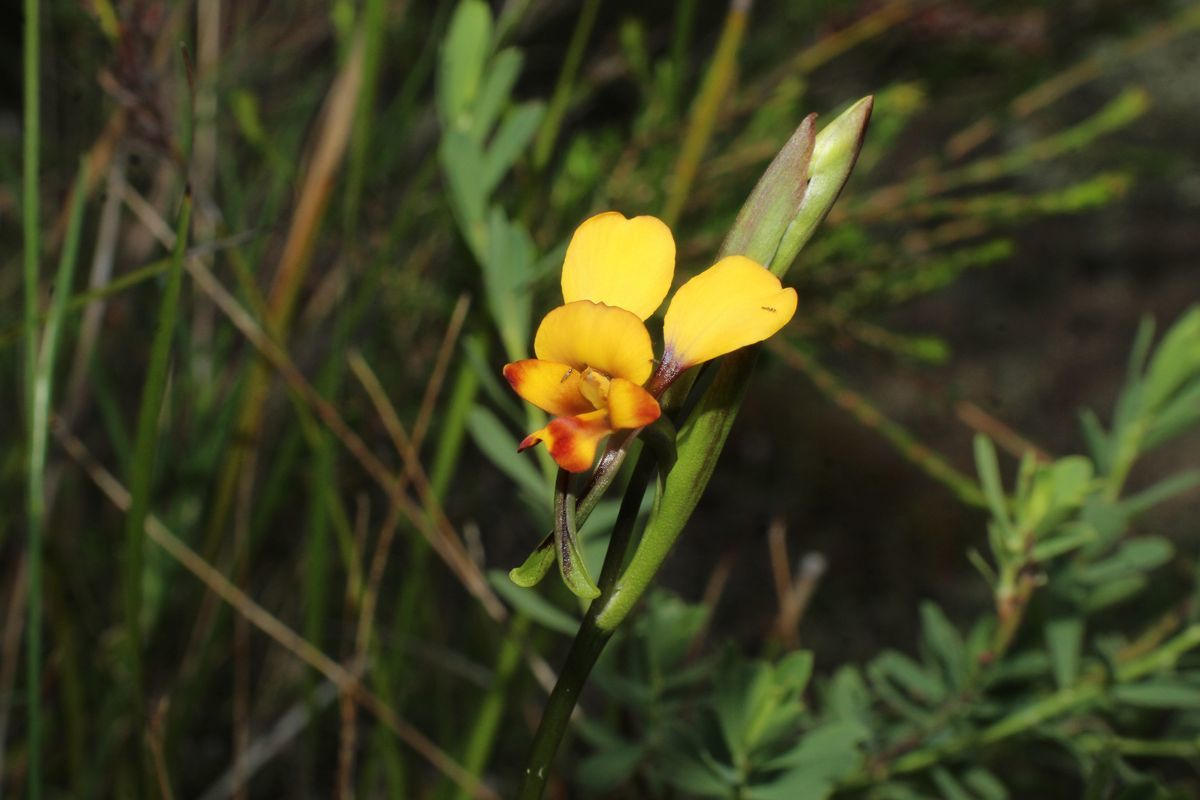

Scientific classification
- Kingdom: Plantae
- Clade: Tracheophytes
- Clade: Angiosperms
- Clade: Monocots
- Order: Asparagales
- Family: Orchidaceae
- Subfamily: Orchidoideae
- Tribe: Diurideae
- Genus: Diuris
- Species: D. brockmanii

Binomial name
- Diuris brockmanii D.L.Jones & C.J.French

Synonyms
- Diuris sp. South Coast (G.Brockman GBB 3041) WA Herbarium

= Diuris brockmanii =

South coast donkey orchid

Species of orchid endemic to South Western Australia

Diuris brockmanii, commonly known as south coast donkey orchid, is a species of orchid that is endemic to the south-west of Western Australia. It has two or three linear leaves and a flowering stem with up to ten yellow flowers with reddish-brown markings.

== Description ==
Diuris brockmanii is a tuberous, perennial herb, usually growing to a height of 130–300 mm (5.1–11.8 in) with two or three linear leaves 80–150 mm (3.1–5.9 in) long and 3–5 mm (0.12–0.20 in) wide. There are up to four yellow and reddish-brown flowers, 28–40 mm (1.1–1.6 in) wide and 17–22 mm (0.67–0.87 in) wide on pedicels 10–20 mm (0.39–0.79 in) long. The flowers have erect, spreading, ear-like petals 12–18 mm (0.47–0.71 in) long, a dorsal sepal 8–11 mm (0.31–0.43 in) long and wide, and narrowly oblong lateral sepals 10–18 mm (0.39–0.71 in) long. The labellum is 6.5–8.0 mm (0.26–0.31 in) long and has three lobes, the lateral ones widely spreading, and the middle lobe broadly wedge–shaped, 6.0–7.5 mm (0.24–0.30 in) long and narrow at the base then flared. The callus is a single smooth, yellowish or reddish ridge 3–4 mm (0.12–0.16 in) long. Flowering occurs from late June to August.

== Taxonomy and naming ==
Diuris brockmanii was first formally described in 2019 by David Jones and Christopher French in Australian Orchid Review from specimens collected by Garry Brockman west of Ravensthorpe in 2013. The specific epithet (brockmanii) honours the collector of the type specimens.

== Distribution and habitat ==
South coast donkey orchid grows in coastal and near-coastal low shrubland, heath and mallee woodland between Esperance and Ongerup in the Coolgardie, Esperance Plains and Mallee bioregions of south-western Western Australia.

== Conservation ==
Diuris brockmanii is listed as "not threatened" by the Western Australian Government Department of Biodiversity, Conservation and Attractions.
