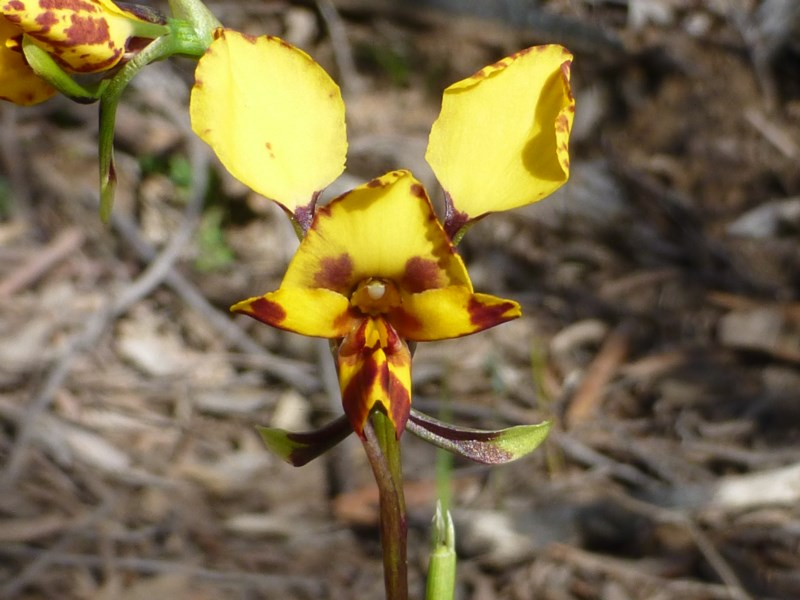
- On Black Mountain in the A.C.T.

Scientific classification
- Kingdom: Plantae
- Clade: Embryophytes
- Clade: Tracheophytes
- Clade: Angiosperms
- Clade: Monocots
- Order: Asparagales
- Family: Orchidaceae
- Subfamily: Orchidoideae
- Tribe: Diurideae
- Genus: Diuris
- Species: D. nigromontana

Binomial name
- Diuris nigromontana D.L.Jones

= Diuris nigromontana =

Black Mountain leopard orchid

Species of orchid

Diuris nigromontana, commonly known as Canberra donkey orchid or Black Mountain leopard orchid, is a species of orchid that is endemic to the Australian Capital Territory. It has two grass-like leaves and up to eight yellow-orange flowers with brownish marks on the labellum.

== Description ==
Diuris nigromontana is a tuberous, perennial herb with two linear leaves folded lengthwise. Between two and eight yellow-orange flowers are borne on a flowering stem up to 350 mm (14 in) tall. The dorsal sepal is tall and usually erect, more or less triangular but with a bluntly-pointed tip. The lateral sepals are crossed, but usually not turned backwards. The petals are usually erect, egg-shaped to round. The labellum has brownish marks and three lobes, the side lobes relatively large and oblong. Flowering occurs in October and November. This orchid is similar to D. semilunulata but is a brighter shade of yellow, has less prominent darker markings and erect petals.

== Taxonomy ==
Diuris nigromontana was first formally described in 2008 by David Jones in "The Orchadian" from a specimen collected on Black Mountain. The specific epithet means "black mountain", referring to Black Mountain where this species is common.

== Distribution and habitat ==
Canberra donkey orchid grows in shrubby woodland and forest, and is locally common around Canberra in the Australian Capital Territory.
