= Diuris brevis =

Short-nosed donkey orchid

Conservation status
- Priority Two — Poorly Known Taxa (DEC)

Scientific classification
- Kingdom: Plantae
- Clade: Tracheophytes
- Clade: Angiosperms
- Clade: Monocots
- Order: Asparagales
- Family: Orchidaceae
- Subfamily: Orchidoideae
- Tribe: Diurideae
- Genus: Diuris
- Species: D. brevis

Binomial name
- Diuris brevis D.L.Jones & C.J.French

Species of orchid

Diuris brevis, commonly known as short-nosed donkey orchid, is a species of orchid that is endemic to a restricted area in the south-west of Western Australia. It has two or three linear leaves and a flowering stem with up to four small yellow and brown flowers with a short labellum.

== Description ==
Diuris brevis is a tuberous, perennial herb, usually growing to a height of 200–300 mm (7.9–11.8 in) with two or three linear leaves 100–150 mm (3.9–5.9 in) long and 5–10 mm (0.20–0.39 in) wide. There are up to four yellow and brown flowers, 20–25 mm (0.79–0.98 in) wide on slender pedicels 10–25 mm (0.39–0.98 in) long. The flowers have erect, widely-spreading, ear-like petals 14–18 mm (0.55–0.71 in) long, a dorsal sepal 6–8 mm (0.24–0.31 in) long and 6–9 mm (0.24–0.35 in) wide, and narrowly oblong, reddish-brown lateral sepals 11–16 mm (0.43–0.63 in) long. The labellum has three lobes, the lateral ones widely spreading, and the middle lobe very short and flattish with down-curved edges and a smooth yellow callus. Flowering occurs from mid-August to September.

== Taxonomy and naming ==
Diuris brevis was first formally described in 2016 by David Jones and Christopher French in Australian Orchid Review from specimens they collected in the Kenwick Swamp in 1997. The specific epithet (brevis) means "short ", referring to the mid-lobe of the labellum.

== Distribution and habitat ==
Short-nosed donkey orchid is only known from the type location where it grows in dense, low shrubland.

== Conservation ==
Diuris brevis is listed as "Priority Two" by the Western Australian Government Department of Biodiversity, Conservation and Attractions, meaning that it is poorly known and from only one or a few locations.
