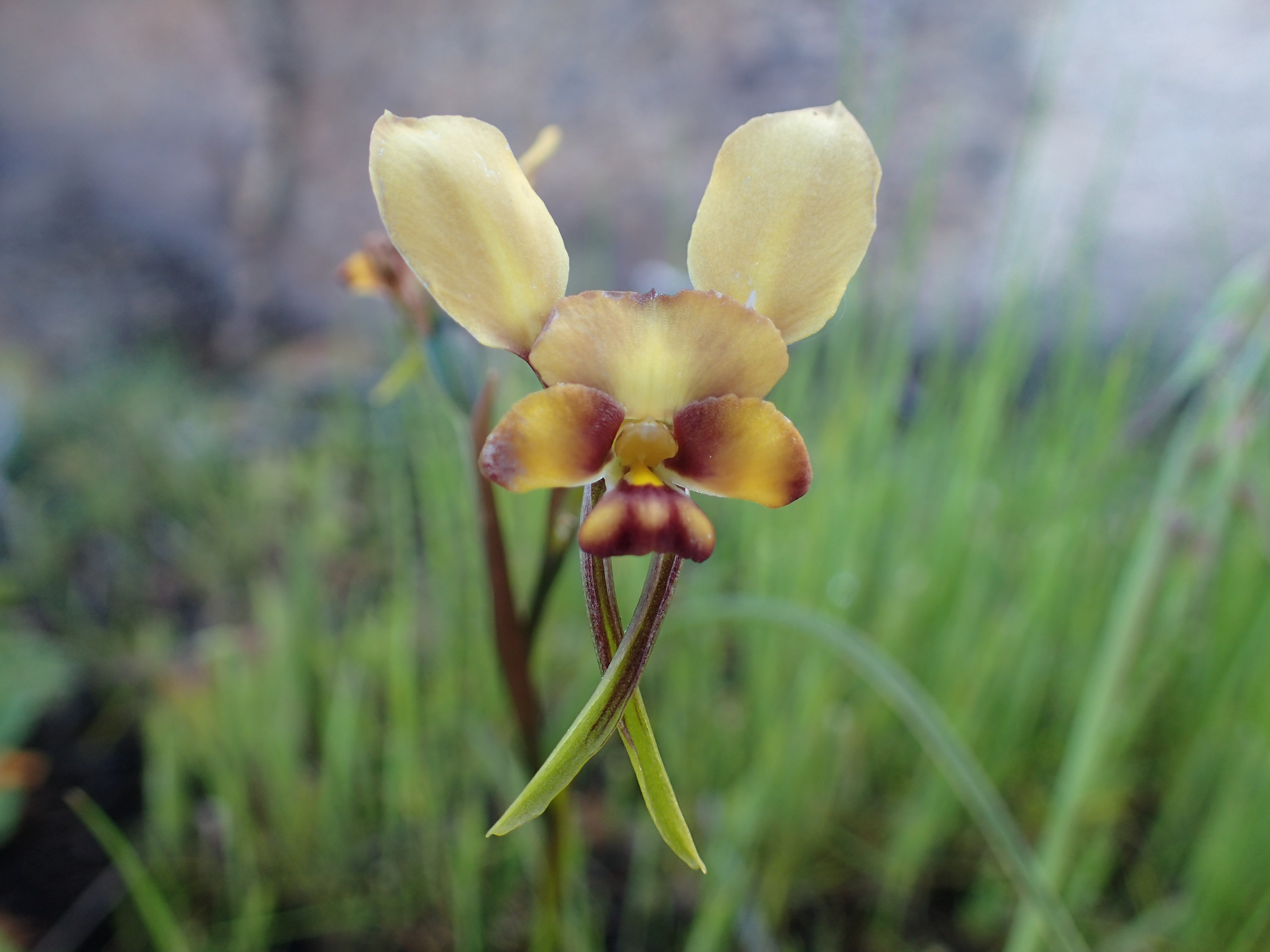
- On Frenchmans Peak in the Cape Le Grand National Park

Scientific classification
- Kingdom: Plantae
- Clade: Embryophytes
- Clade: Tracheophytes
- Clade: Angiosperms
- Clade: Monocots
- Order: Asparagales
- Family: Orchidaceae
- Subfamily: Orchidoideae
- Tribe: Diurideae
- Genus: Diuris
- Species: D. conspicillata

Binomial name
- Diuris conspicillata D.L.Jones

= Diuris conspicillata =

Spectacled donkey orchid

Species of orchid

Diuris conspicillata, commonly called the spectacled donkey orchid, is a species of orchid which is endemic to the south-west of Western Australia. It is an uncommon species, only found on two coastal granite outcrops, growing in shallow soil pockets.

== Description ==
Diuris conspicillata is a tuberous, perennial herb, usually growing to a height of 150–300 mm (6–10 in) with two or three leaves emerging at the base, each 100–200 mm (4–8 in) long and 5–10 mm (0.2–0.4 in) wide. There are up to six yellow and brown flowers 30–50 mm (1–2 in) long 20–40 mm (0.8–2 in) wide. The flowers have broad, ear-like petals, a short, relatively wide dorsal sepal and hanging, crossed lateral sepals. The labellum is a narrow wedge shape and has three lobes, the lateral ones broad and spreading, and the middle lobe short and flattened. Flowering occurs from August to September.

== Taxonomy and naming ==
Diuris conspicillata was first formally described in 1991 by David Jones and the description was published in Australian Orchid Review. The specific epithet (conspicillata) refers to the markings on the labellum which give the impression of spectacles.

== Distribution and habitat ==
The spectacled donkey orchid is only known from two populations growing in shallow soil pockets on coastal granite outcrops near Esperance.

== Conservation ==
Diuris conspicillata is classified as "not threatened" by the Western Australian Government Department of Parks and Wildlife.
