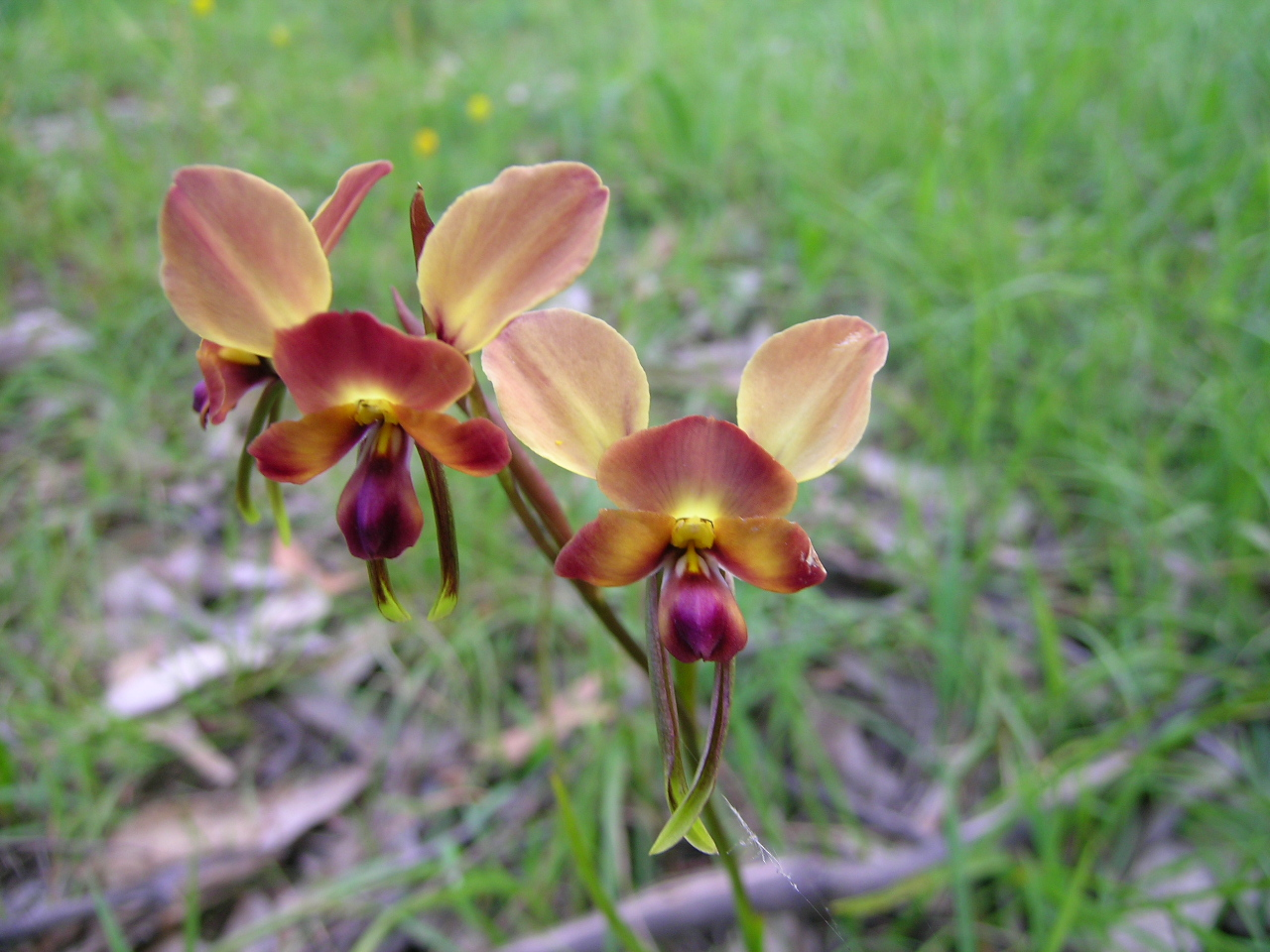
- In the Adelaide Hills

Scientific classification
- Kingdom: Plantae
- Clade: Embryophytes
- Clade: Tracheophytes
- Clade: Angiosperms
- Clade: Monocots
- Order: Asparagales
- Family: Orchidaceae
- Subfamily: Orchidoideae
- Tribe: Diurideae
- Genus: Diuris
- Species: D. orientis

Binomial name
- Diuris orientis D.L.Jones

= Diuris orientis =

Eastern donkey orchid

Species of orchid

Diuris orientis, commonly called the eastern donkey orchid or wallflower donkey orchid, is a species of orchid that is endemic to eastern Australia. Like others in the genus Diuris, it has two ear-like petals and is similar to the common donkey orchid (Diuris corymbosa) of Western Australia with which it has been confused. This species is found in New South Wales, Victoria, South Australia and Tasmania and its stalk-like petal "claw" is shorter in than those of D. corymbosa.

== Description ==
Diuris orientis is a tuberous, perennial, terrestrial herb, usually growing to a height of 12–35 cm (5–10 in). There are up to three leaves arising from the base of the plant, each leaf linear to narrow lance-shaped, 10–30 cm (4–10 in) long, 5–10 mm (0.2–0.4 in) wide and channelled.

There are up to 6 yellow flowers with reddish brown, purplish and mauve markings on a raceme 8–40 mm (0.3–2 in) high. The dorsal sepal is erect, broadly egg-shaped, 9–15 mm (0.4–0.6 in) long and wide. The lateral sepals are greenish-brown, linear to lance-shaped, 12–23 mm (0.5–0.9 in) long, 3–4 mm (0.1–0.2 in) wide, project down below the flow and are parallel or sometimes crossed. The petals are erect and spread, ear-like above the flower. They are broadly egg-shaped, 12–20 mm (0.5–0.8 in) long, 8–12 mm (0.3–0.5 in) wide on a greenish-brown, stalk-like "claw", 3–6 mm (0.1–0.2 in). (The claw in the similar Western Australian Diuris corymbosa is longer.) The labellum is 10–14 mm (0.4–0.6 in) long and is divided into three lobes. The lateral lobes are narrow egg-shaped to wedge shaped, 7–11 mm (0.3–0.4 in) long, 2.5–4 mm (0.1–0.2 in) wide, sometimes with a wavy margin. The medial lobe is 5–8 mm (0.2–0.3 in), wedge-shaped, strongly folded with a rounded tip. There is a callus near the base of the mid-lobe, consisting of a narrow, yellow ridge. Flowering usually occurs between September and November.

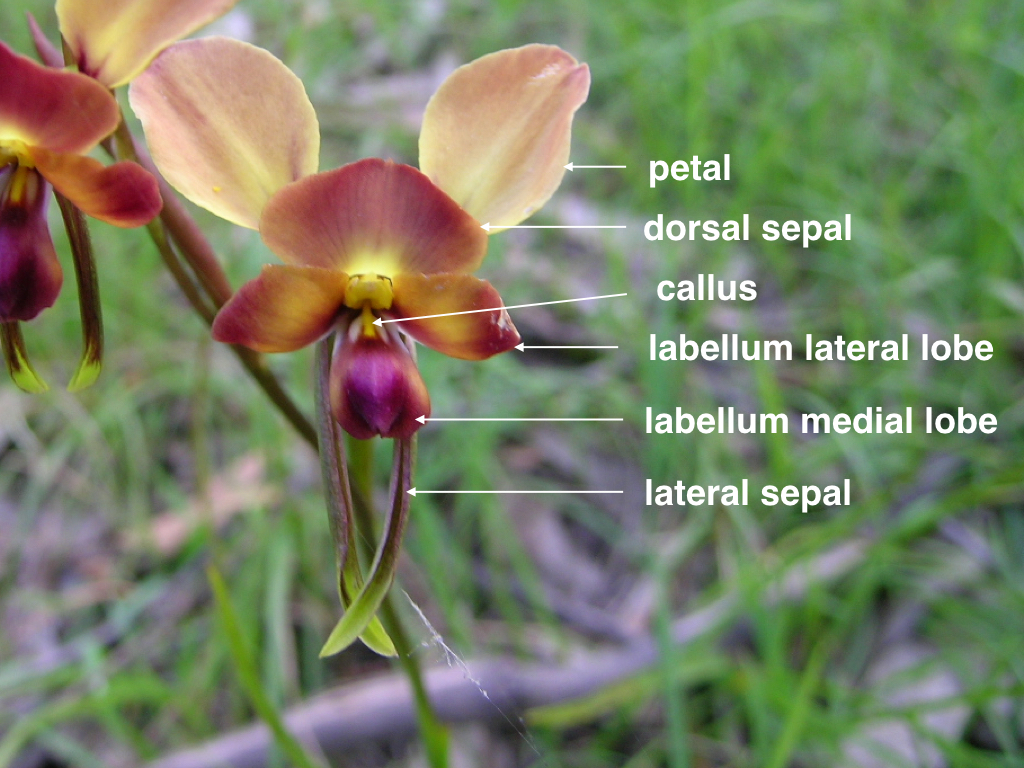
Labelled image

== Taxonomy and naming ==
Diuris orientis was first formally described in 1998 by David Jones from a specimen collected at Beauty Point in Tasmania. The description was published in Australian Orchid Research. The specific epithet (orientis) is a Latin word meaning "east", referring to the easterly distribution of this species, compared to other orchids in the Diuris corymbosa complex.

== Distribution and habitat ==
The eastern wallflower orchid is widely distributed in South Australia, Tasmania and Victoria. In New South Wales it is only found in the far south east, in and near the Nadgee Nature Reserve. In Victoria it is fairly common in open forest and heath. There is a dramatic increase in the flowering of this species after summer bushfires.
