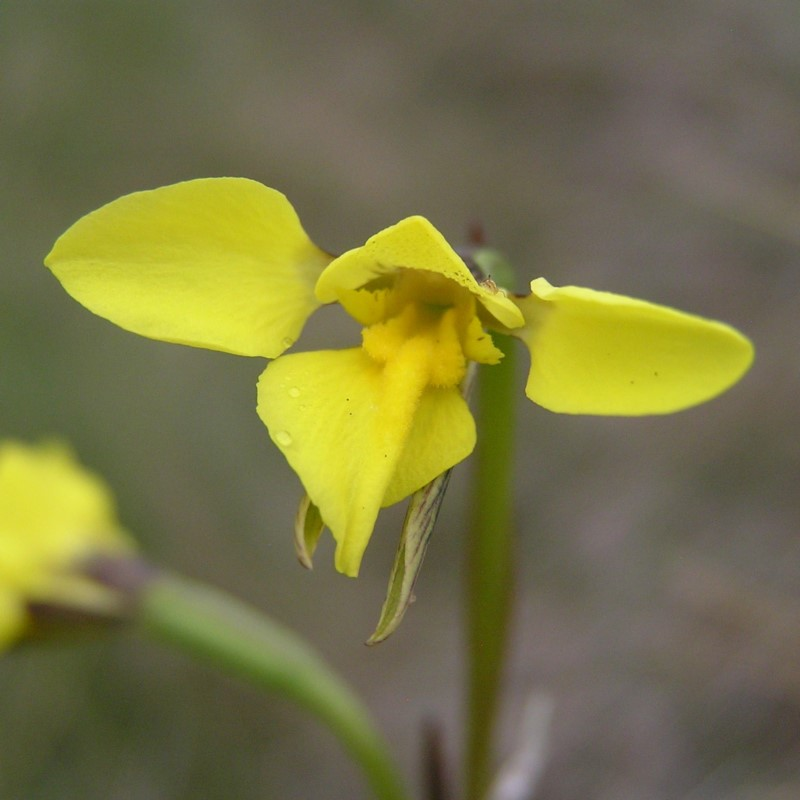
- In Namadgi National Park

Scientific classification
- Kingdom: Plantae
- Clade: Embryophytes
- Clade: Tracheophytes
- Clade: Angiosperms
- Clade: Monocots
- Order: Asparagales
- Family: Orchidaceae
- Subfamily: Orchidoideae
- Tribe: Diurideae
- Genus: Diuris
- Species: D. monticola

Binomial name
- Diuris monticola D.L.Jones

= Diuris monticola =

Highland golden moths

Species of orchid

Diuris monticola, commonly known as highland golden moths, is a species of orchid that is endemic to south-eastern Australia. It is a common and widespread, late flowering species growing in grassland and woodland habitats at higher altitudes. It has a tuft of up to nine leaves at the base and up to four slightly drooping bright yellow flowers with dark streaks in the centre.

== Description ==
Diuris monticola is a tuberous, perennial herb with between five and nine narrow linear leaves 50–200 mm (2–8 in) long and 3–4 mm (0.1–0.2 in) wide in a loose tuft. Up to four slightly drooping bright yellow flowers with dark streaks in the centre and 15–28 mm (0.6–1 in) wide are borne on a flowering stem 150–350 mm (6–10 in) tall. The dorsal sepal leans forward and is egg-shaped, 9–12 mm (0.4–0.5 in) long and 7–9 mm (0.3–0.4 in) wide. The lateral sepals are lance-shaped to egg-shaped, the narrower end towards the base, 15–25 mm (0.6–1 in) long, 2.5–4.5 mm (0.1–0.2 in) wide, lean downwards and parallel to each other. The petals are egg-shaped, 7–13 mm (0.3–0.5 in) long, 4–9 mm (0.2–0.4 in) wide and spread apart from each other on a blackish stalk 3–5.5 mm (0.1–0.2 in) long. The labellum is 12–17 mm (0.5–0.7 in) long and has three lobes. The centre lobe is egg-shaped, 7–13 mm (0.3–0.5 in) long and 6–12 mm (0.2–0.5 in) wide and the side lobes are linear to narrowly wedge-shaped, 2–3.5 mm (0.08–0.1 in) long and 1–2 mm (0.04–0.08 in) wide with irregular edges. There are two pimply, darker yellow callus ridges in the lower part of the mid-line of the labellum. Flowering occurs from November to January.

== Taxonomy and naming ==
Diuris monticola was first formally described in 1998 by David Jones from a specimen collected near Tantangara Dam and the description was published in Australian Orchid Research. Jones derived the specific epithet (monticola) from the Latin mons meaning "mountain" and -cola meaning "dweller", referring to the montane habitat of this species.

== Distribution and habitat ==
Highland golden moths is widespread and common in montane grassland, and snowgum woodland in the higher parts of southern New South Wales, Tasmania, the Australian Capital Territory and north-eastern Victoria.
