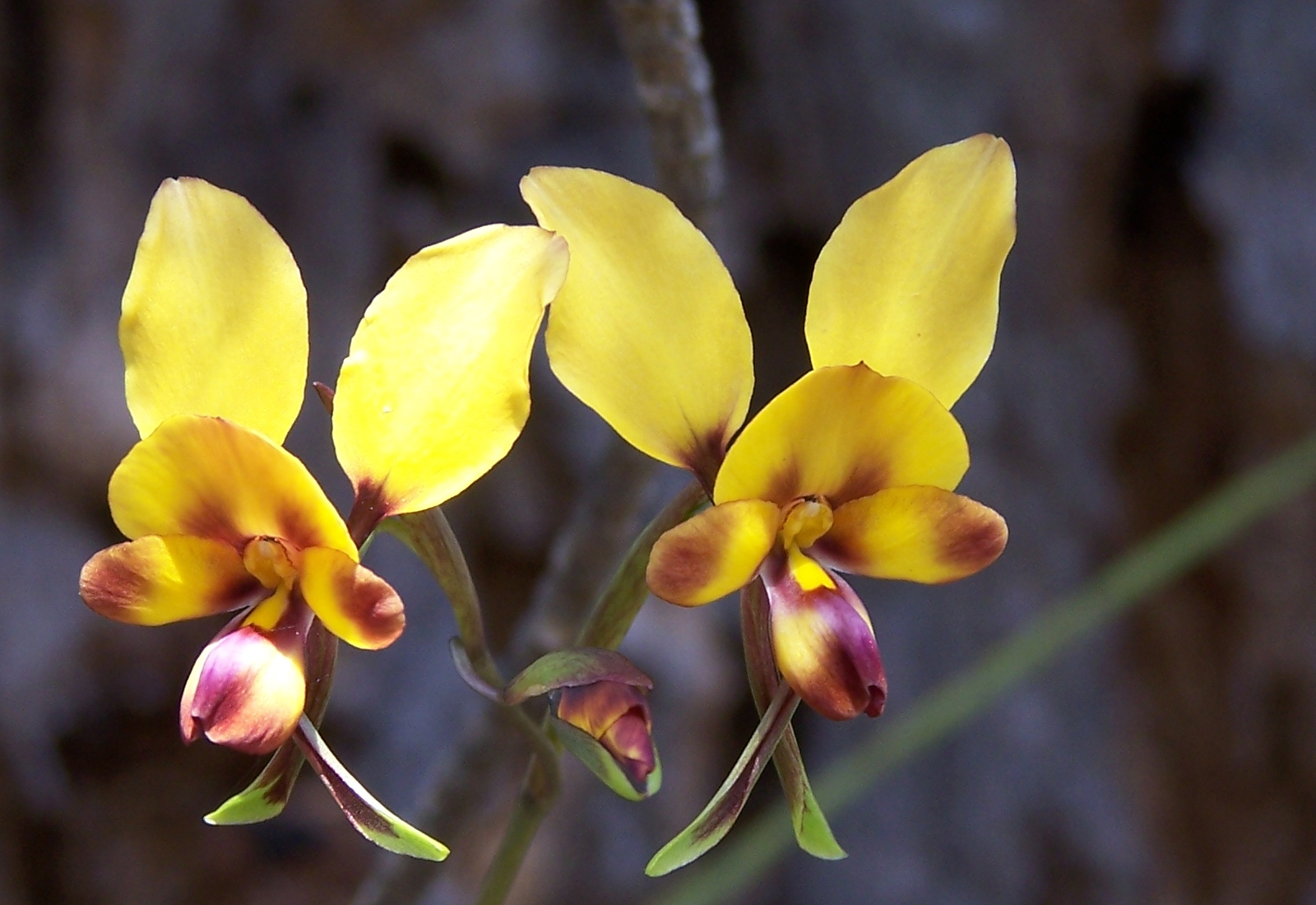
- Diuris corymbosa

Scientific classification
- Kingdom: Plantae
- Clade: Tracheophytes
- Clade: Angiosperms
- Clade: Monocots
- Order: Asparagales
- Family: Orchidaceae
- Subfamily: Orchidoideae
- Tribe: Diurideae
- Subtribe: Diuridinae
- Genus: Diuris; Sm.

= Diuris =

Donkey orchids

Genus of plants

Diuris, commonly known as donkey orchids, bee orchids, nanny goat orchids or pansy orchids, is a genus of more than sixty species of flowering plants in the orchid family, Orchidaceae and is endemic to Australia, apart from one species endemic to Timor. The name "Diuris" refers to the hanging sepals but the common name "donkey orchid", derives from the ear-like petals common to all species. Many have mainly yellow flowers with darker markings and are thought to mimic nectar-producing flowers which open at the same time.

== Description ==
Orchids in the genus Diuris are terrestrial, perennial, deciduous, sympodial herbs, usually with a few inconspicuous, fine roots and one or two tubers lacking a protective sheath. The stem is short, erect and unbranched with a leaf-like cataphyll at each node. There are between one and ten grass-like leaves at the base of the plant.

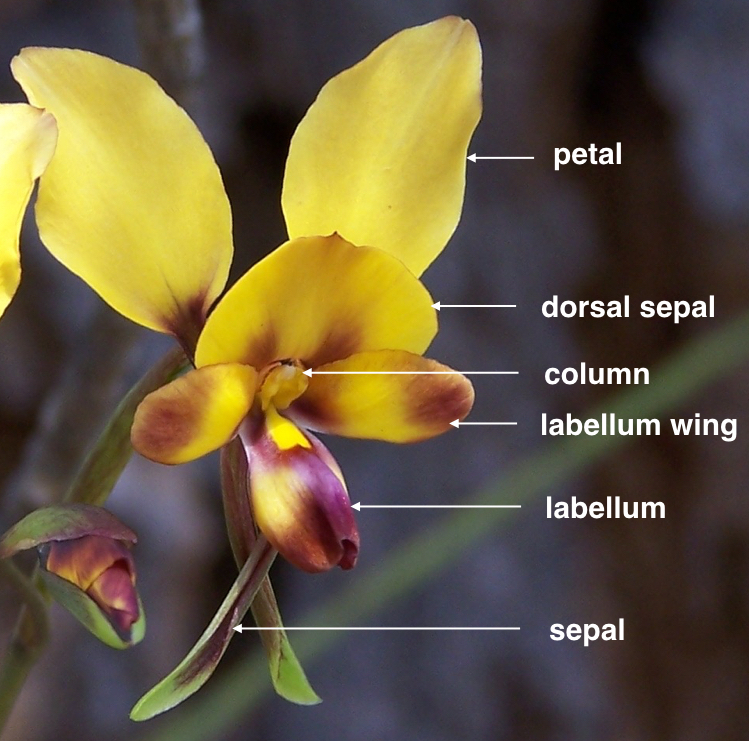
Labelled image

The inflorescence is a raceme with a few to many brightly coloured, resupinate flowers on a wiry stalk. The dorsal sepal is shorter but wider than two lateral sepals and forms a hood over the column. The long, narrow, lateral sepals hang like a pair of tails below the labellum. The petals are different from the sepals, having a narrow base with the main part widely expanded, in the form of donkey ears. As is usual in orchids, one petal is highly modified as the central labellum, differing markedly from the other petals and sepals. The labellum has three distinct parts with the central part folded and the lateral parts arranged on either side of the column, often spreading widely, sometimes with a scalloped or wavy edge. The column is short with narrow wings. Flowering time depends on the species but most species flower between September and November. One of the earliest to flower, D. brumalis flowers in June and D. emarginata sometimes flowers as late as January. The fruit which follows flowering is a thin-walled, dehiscent capsule containing up to 100 winged seeds.

== Taxonomy and naming ==
The genus Diuris was first formally described in 1798 by James Edward Smith and the description was published in Transactions of the Linnean Society of London. Smith did not nominate a type species.

The common name "donkey orchid" refers to the ear-like petals. The scientific name is derived from the Greek dis meaning 'double' and oura, 'tail', referring to the two narrow lateral sepals.

== Distribution and habitat ==
Donkey orchids occur in all Australian states, but not the Northern Territory with one species (D. fryana) found in Timor. In New South Wales, most species grow among grasses in sclerophyll forest. In Western Australia, most grow in moist places such as coastal swamps or near granite outcrops. Donkey orchids usually grow as individual plants or in loose colonies and most occur at low altitudes, although D. monticola grows at up to 1,800 m (6,000 ft). Some species flower more profusely after fire and D. purdiei will only flower following a summer fire. In fire-prone areas, the tubers lie dormant in the soil and are not harmed by bushfires.

== Ecology ==
Donkey orchids are coloured like flowers that attract pollinating insects such as wasps, bees and flies but no Diuris produce nectar and very few have a scent. It is thought that Diuris species deceive insects by falsely advertising the presence of food and this hypothesis is supported by experiments on only one species, D. pardina.

== Gallery ==
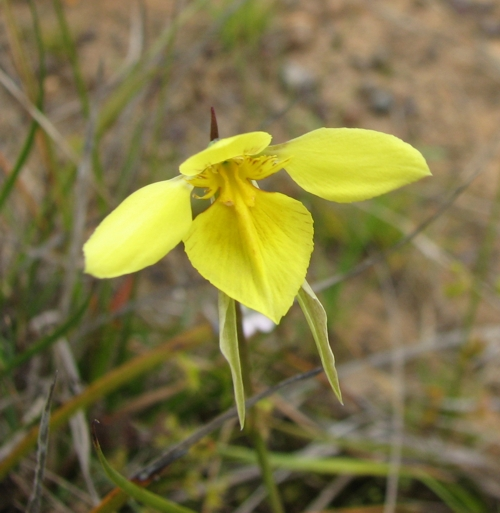
Diuris behrii

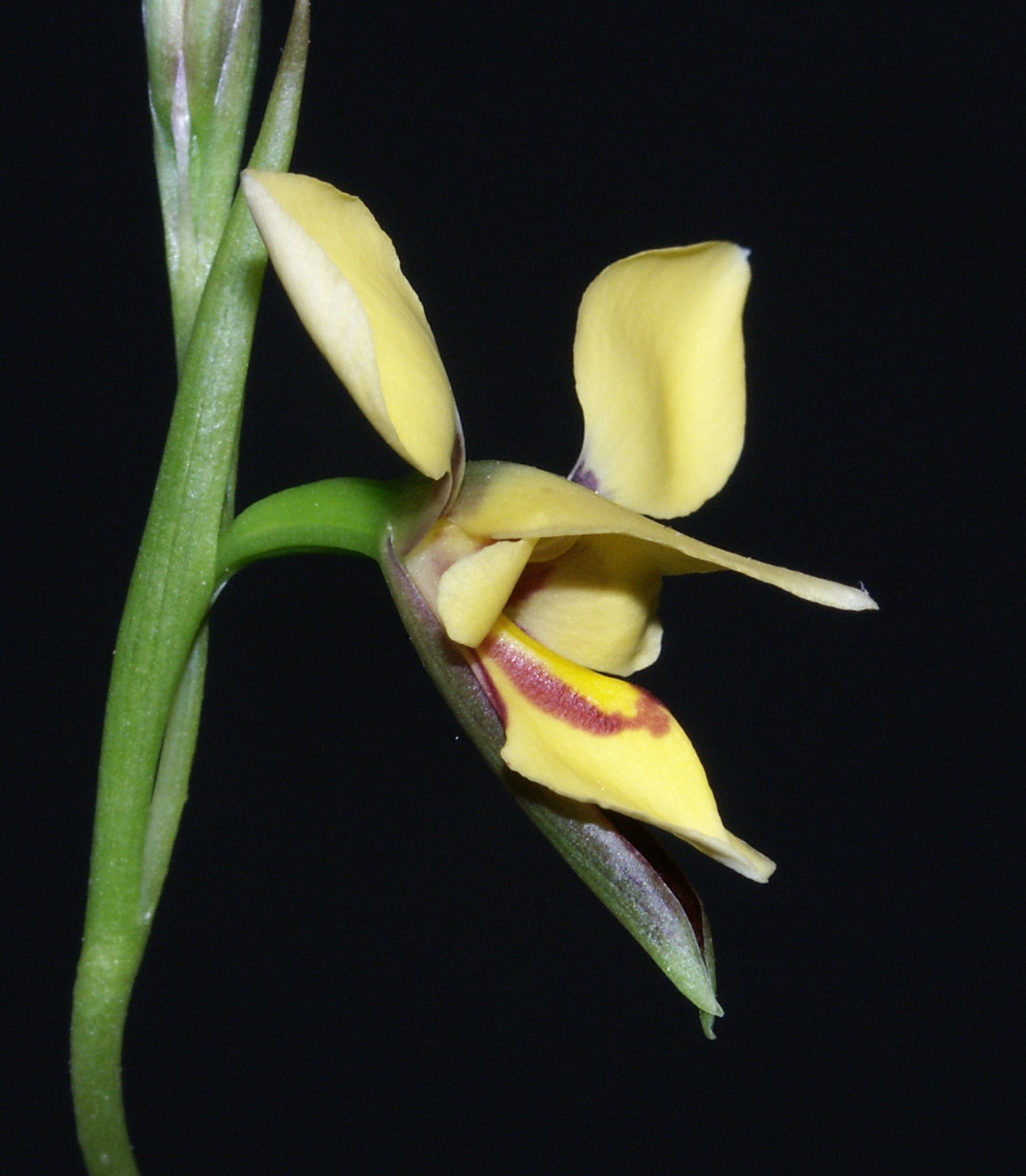
Diuris drummondii

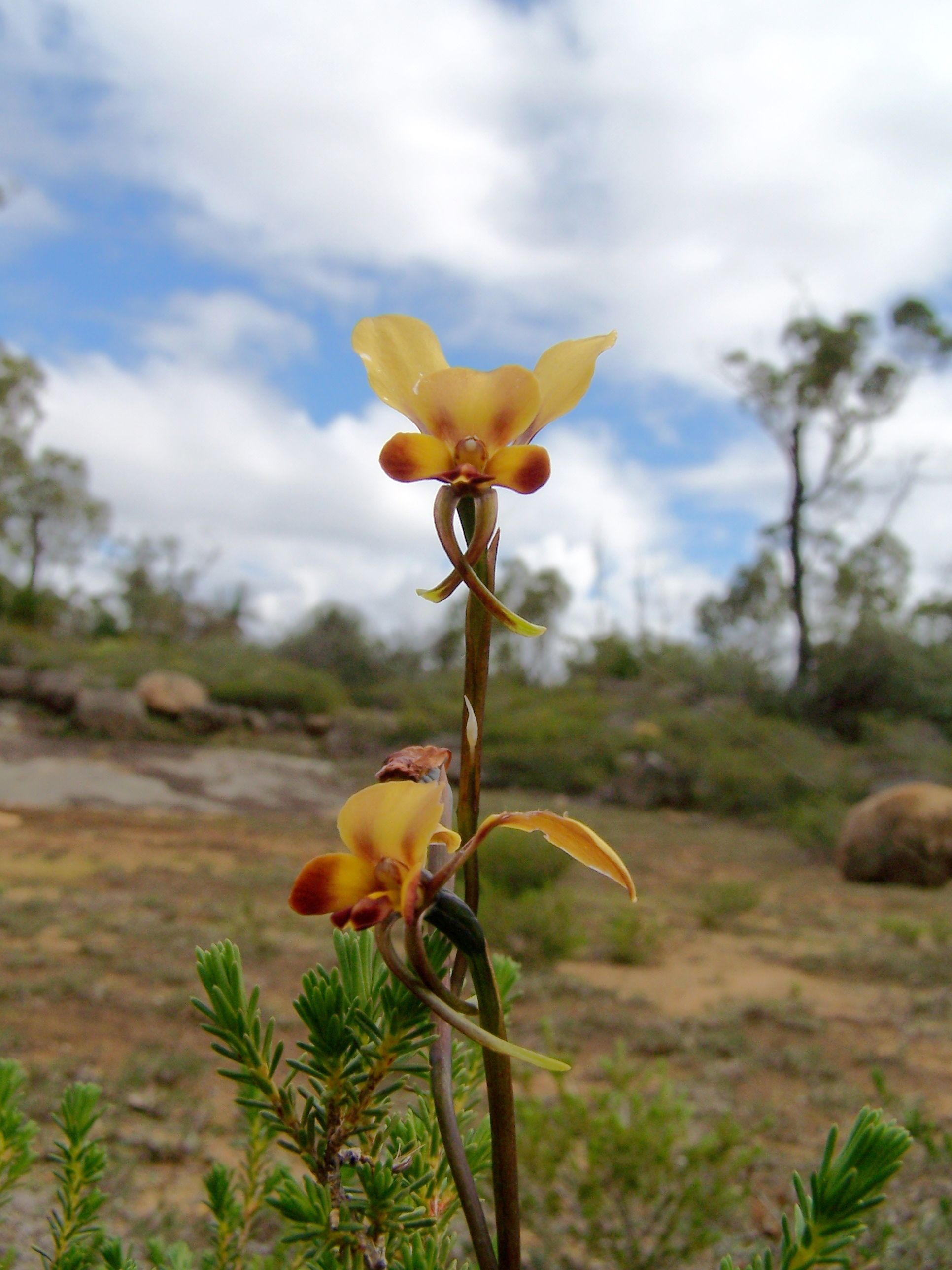
Diuris brumalis

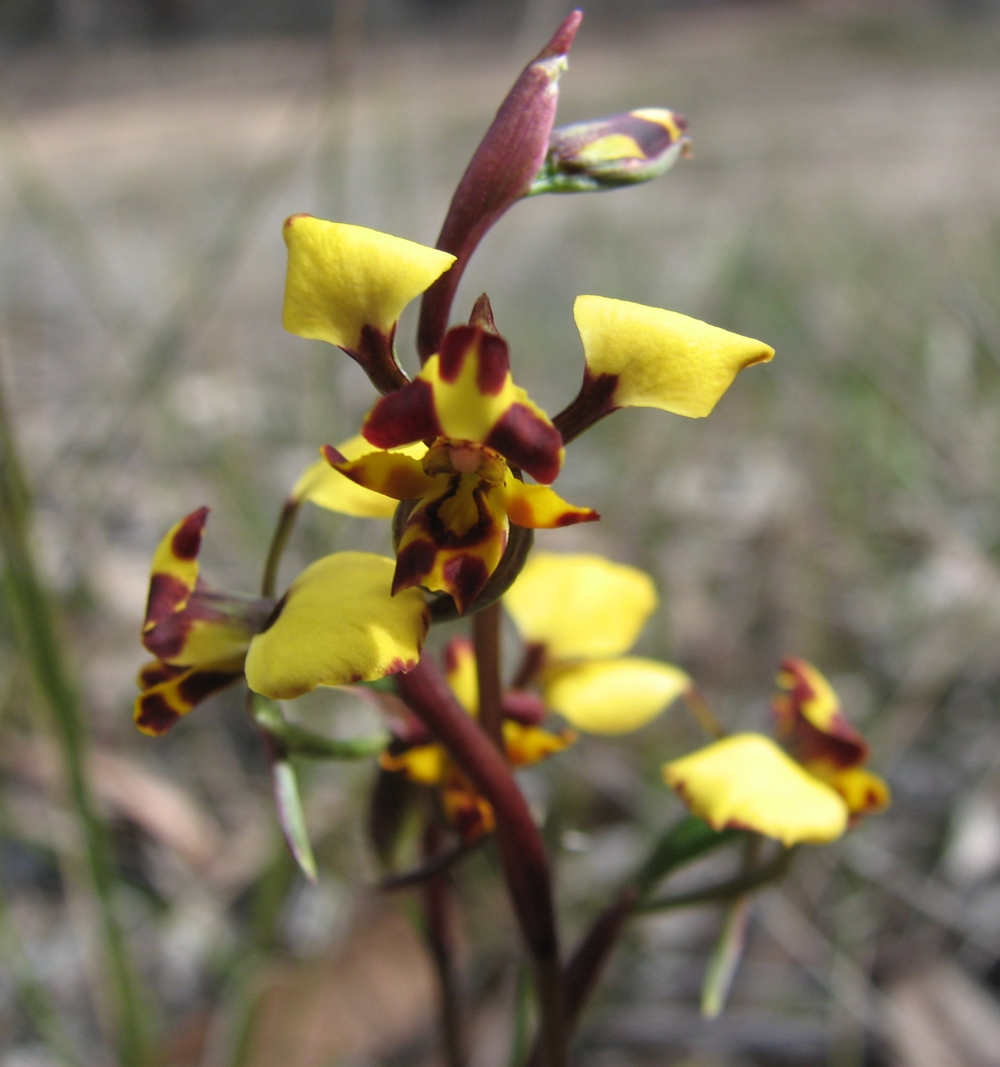
Diuris pardina

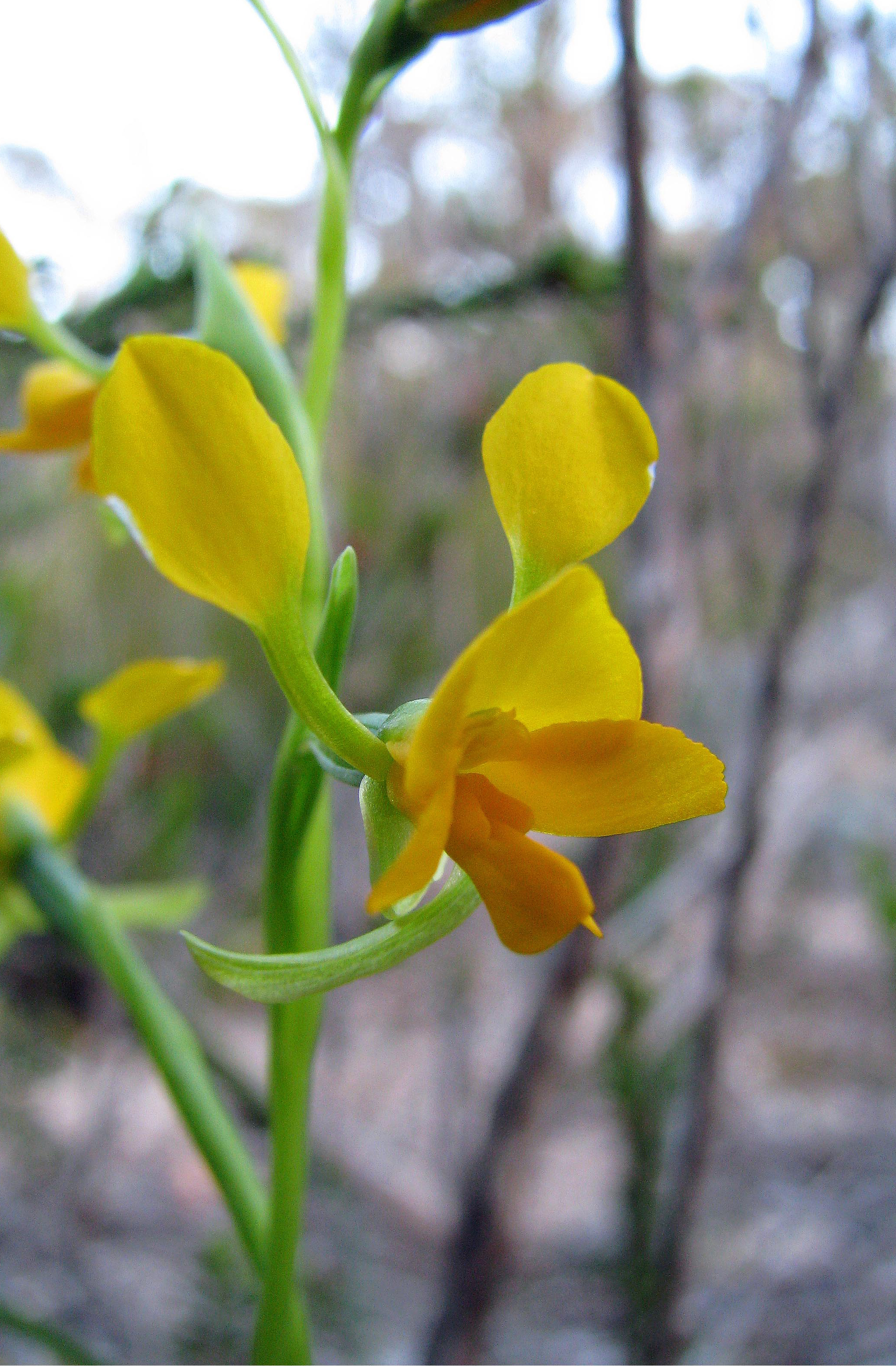
Diuris aequalis

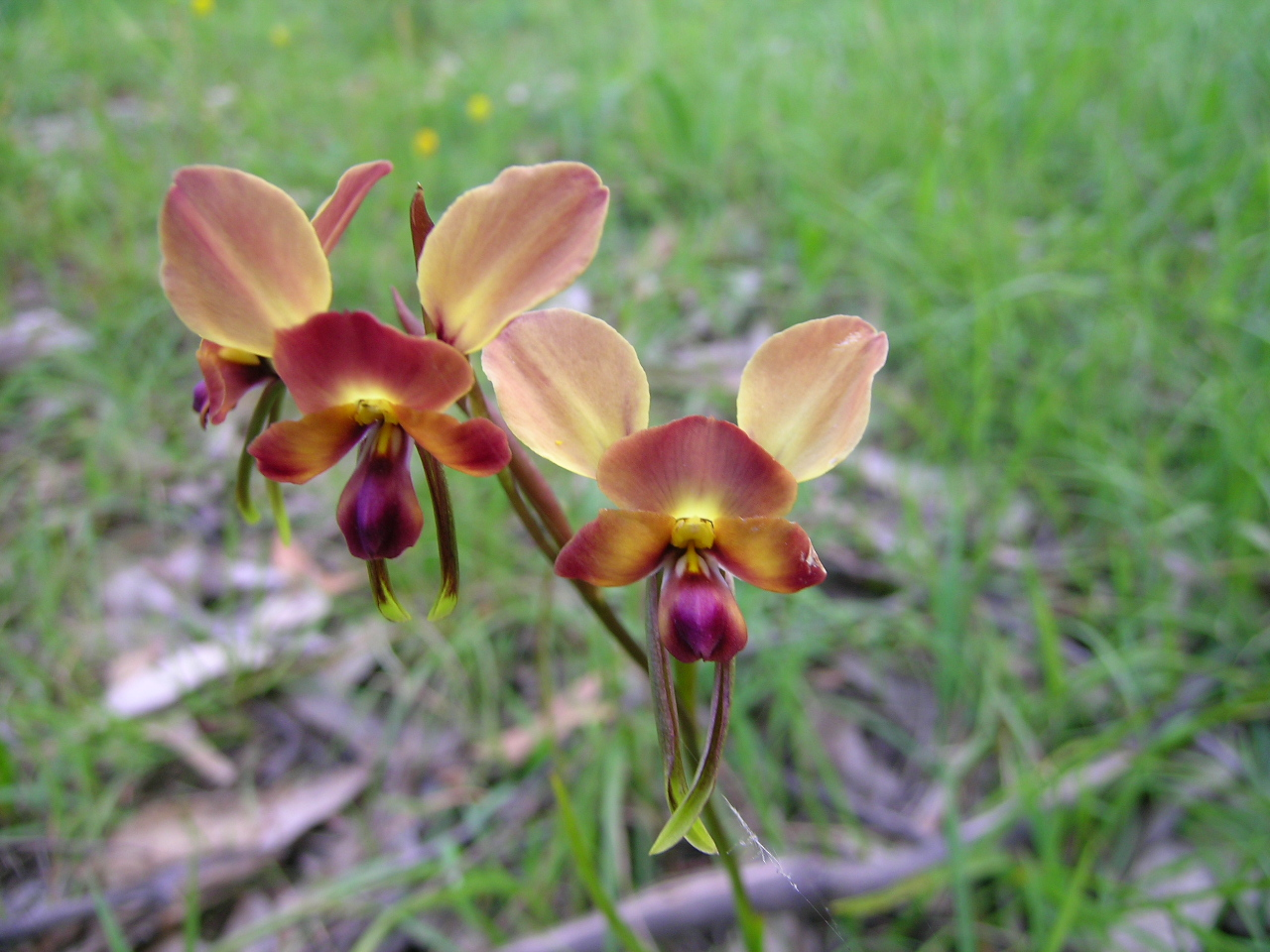
Diuris orientis

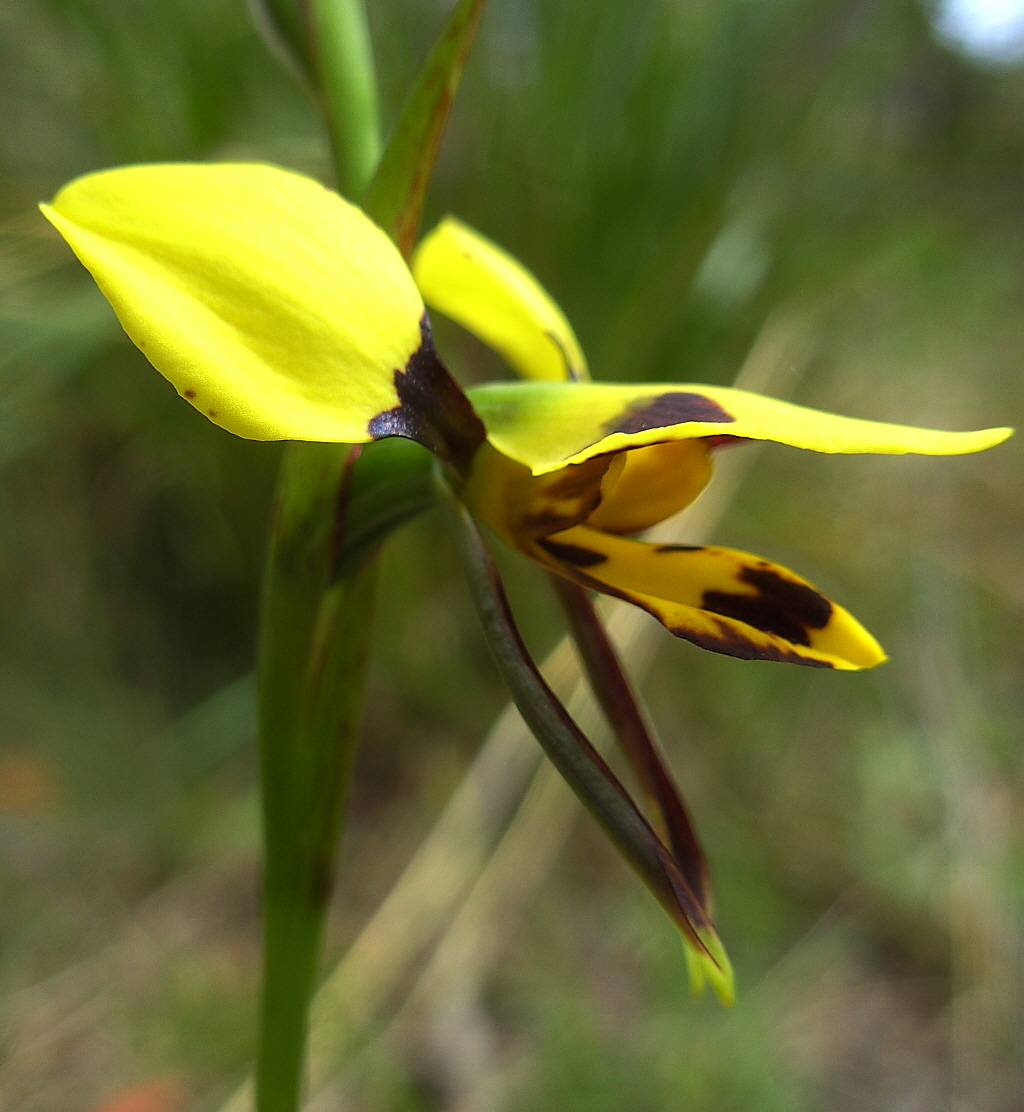
Diuris sulphurea

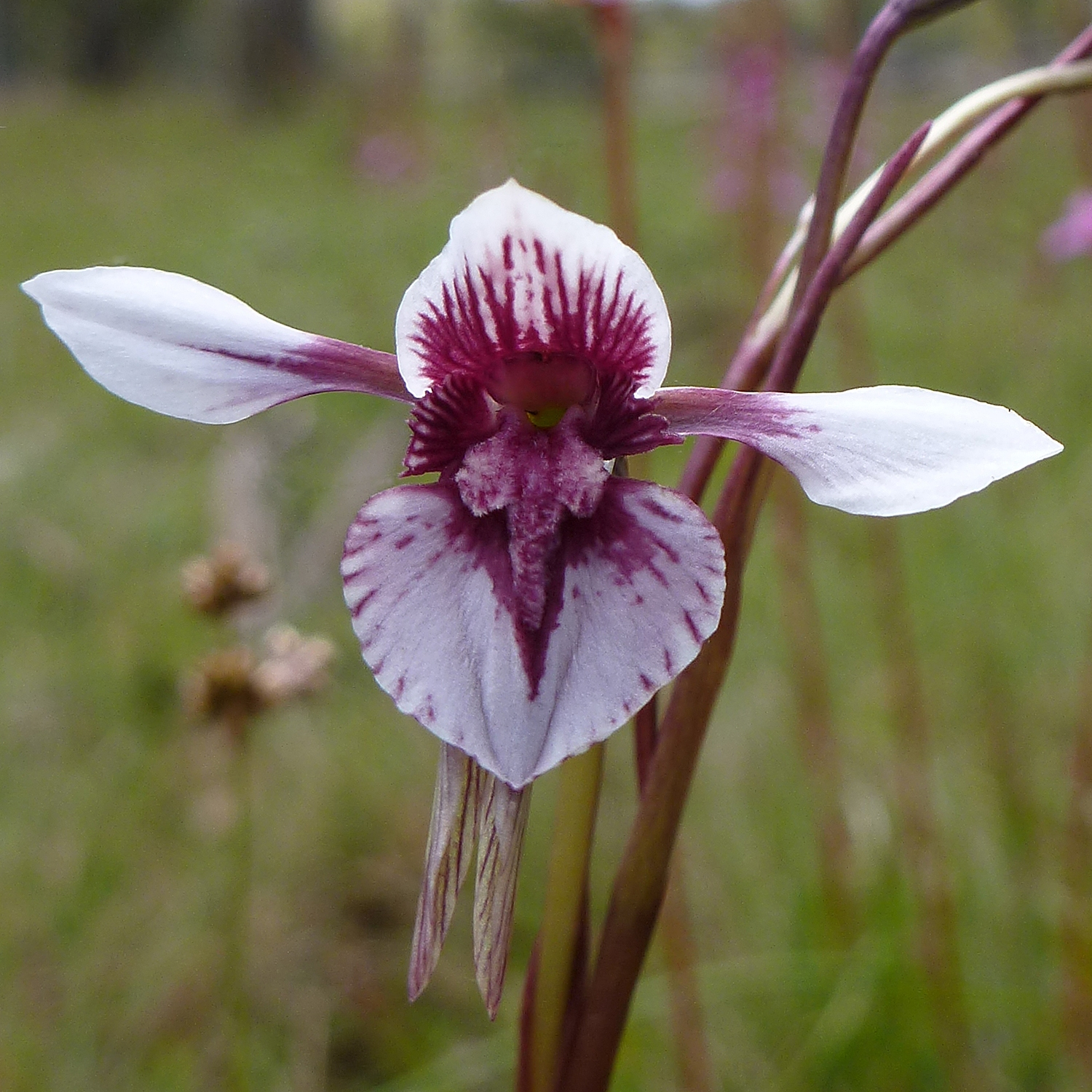
Diuris venosa

== Species ==
The following is a list of Diuris species accepted by the Plants of the World Online as of September:

- Diuris abbreviata F.Muell. ex Benth – lemon doubletail (N.S.W., Qld.)
- Diuris aequalis F.Muell. ex Fitzg. – buttercup doubletail (N.S.W.)
- Diuris alba R.Br. – white donkey orchid (N.S.W., Qld.)
- Diuris amabilis D.L.Jones – lovely moths (N.S.W., A.C.T.)
- Diuris amplissima D.L.Jones – giant donkey orchid (W.A.)
- Diuris arenaria D.L.Jones – Tomaree donkey orchid, sand doubletail (N.S.W.)
- Diuris aurea Sm. – golden donkey orchid (N.S.W., Qld.)
- Diuris basaltica D.L.Jones – little golden moths, small golden moths (Vic.)
- Diuris behrii Schltdl. – golden cowslips (S.A.)
- Diuris blakneyae (F.M.Bailey) D.L.Jones (Qld.)
- Diuris brachyscapa D.L.Jones & C.J.French – western wheatbelt donkey orchid (W.A.)
- Diuris bracteata Fitzg. (N.S.W.)
- Diuris brevifolia R.S.Rogers – short-leaved donkey orchid (S.A.)
- Diuris brevis D.L.Jones & C.J.French – short-nosed donkey orchid (W.A.)
- Diuris brevissima Fitzg. ex Nicholls (N.S.W.)
- Diuris brockmanii D.L.Jones & C.J.French – south coast donkey orchid (W.A.)
- Diuris brumalis D.L.Jones – winter donkey orchid (W.A.)
- Diuris byronensis D.L.Jones – Byron Bay donkey orchid (N.S.W.)
- Diuris calcicola R.J.Bates (S.A.)
- Diuris callitrophila D.L.Jones – Oaklands doubletail, Oaklands diuris (N.S.W.)
- Diuris carecta D.L.Jones & C.J.French – sedge-loving donkey orchid (W.A.)
- Diuris carinata Lindl – tall bee orchid (W.A.)
- Diuris chrysantha D.L.Jones & M.A.Clem. – granite donkey orchid (N.S.W., Qld.)
- Diuris chryseopsis D.L.Jones – common golden moths, small snake orchid (N.S.W., Vic., Tas. S.A.)
- Diuris concinna D.L.Jones – elegant donkey orchid (W.A.)
- Diuris conspicillata D.L.Jones – spectacled donkey orchid (W.A.)
- Diuris corymbosa Lindl. – common donkey orchid, wallflower orchid (W.A., S.A., Vic., N.S.W.)
- Diuris cruenta D.L.Jones & C.J.French – Kemerton donkey orchid (W.A.)
- Diuris cuneata Fitzg.
- Diuris curta D.L.Jones (N.S.W., Qld.)
- Diuris decrementum D.L.Jones & C.J.French – common bee orchid (W.A.)
- Diuris disposita D.L.Jones (N.S.W.)
- Diuris drummondii Lindl. – tall donkey orchid (W.A.)
- Diuris eborensis D.L.Jones (N.S.W.)
- Diuris eburnea D.L.Jones (W.A.)
- Diuris emarginata R.Br. – tall donkey orchid
  - Diuris emarginata var. emarginata (W.A.)
  - Diuris emarginata var. pauciflora A.S.George
- Diuris exitela D.L.Jones – Mount Moffat doubletail (Qld.)
- Diuris filifolia Lindl. – cat's face orchid (W.A.)
- Diuris flavescens D.L.Jones – pale yellow doubletail, Wingham doubletail (N.S.W.)
- Diuris fragrantissima D.L.Jones & M.A.Clem. – fragrant doubletail, Sunshine diuris (Vic.)
- Diuris fryana Ridl. (Lesser Sunda Islands)
- Diuris fucosa D.L.Jones (N.S.W., Vic.)
- Diuris gregaria D.L.Jones – clumping golden moths (Vic.)
- Diuris hazeliae D.L.Jones – yellow granite donkey orchid (W.A.)
- Diuris heberlei D.L.Jones – Heberle's donkey orchid (W.A.)
- Diuris immaculata D.L.Jones – little Esperance bee orchid (W.A.)
- Diuris inopinus D.L.Jones (N.S.W.)
- Diuris insignis D.L.Jones & C.J.French – dark bee orchid (W.A.)
- Diuris inundata D.L.Jones & R.J.Bates (S.A.)
- Diuris jonesii C.J.French & G.Brockman – Dunsborough donkey orchid (W.A.)
- Diuris laevis Fitzg. – nannygoat orchid (W.A.)
- Diuris lanceolata Lindl. – large golden moths (N.S.W., Vic., S.A., Tas.)
- Diuris laxiflora Lindl. – bee orchid (W.A.)
- Diuris leopardina D.L.Jones & R.J.Bates (S.A.)
- Diuris littoralis D.L.Jones & C.J.French – Green Range donkey orchid (W.A.)
- Diuris longifolia R.Br. – purple pansy orchid, common donkey orchid (W.A.)
- Diuris luteola D.L.Jones & B.Gray – northern doubletail (Qld.)
- Diuris maculata Sm. – spotted doubletail (Qld., N.S.W., Vic., S.A., Tas.)
- Diuris magnifica D.L.Jones – large pansy orchid (W.A.)
- Diuris micrantha D.L.Jones – dwarf bee orchid, tiny bee orchid (W.A.)
- Diuris monticola D.L.Jones – highland golden moths (N.S.W., Vic., Tas.)
- Diuris nigromontana D.L.Jones – Black Mountain leopard orchid (A.C.T.)
- Diuris ochroma D.L.Jones – pale goat orchid, pale golden moths (N.S.W., Vic.)
- Diuris oporina D.L.Jones – autumn donkey orchid, northern white donkeys tails (Qld.)
- Diuris oraria D.L.Jones & C.J.French – northern coastal donkey orchid (W.A.)
- Diuris orientis D.L.Jones – eastern donkey orchid, wallflower donkey orchid (N.S.W., S.A., Vic., Tas.)
- Diuris ostrina D.L.Jones & C.J.French – Darling Scarp donkey orchid (W.A.)
- Diuris pallescens D.L.Jones & C.J.French – pale donkey orchid (W.A.)
- Diuris palustris Lindl. – swamp doubletail, swamp diuris (S.A., Vic., Tas.)
- Diuris pardina Lindl. – leopard orchid, leopard doubletail (N.S.W., S.A., Vic., Tas.)
- Diuris parvipetala (Dockrill) D.L.Jones & M.A.Clem. – slender purple donkey orchid (N.S.W., Qld.)
- Diuris pedunculata R.Br. – small snake orchid (N.S.W.)
- Diuris perialla D.L.Jones & C.J.French – early donkey orchid (W.A.)
- Diuris picta J.Drumm. – granite bee orchid, granite donkey orchid (W.A.)
- Diuris platichila Fitzg. – Blue Mountains doubletail (N.S.W.)
- Diuris porphyrochila D.L.Jones & C.J.French – Yalgorup donkey orchid (W.A.)
- Diuris porrifolia Lindl. – small-flowered donkey orchid (W.A.)
- Diuris praecox D.L.Jones – early doubletail, Newcastle doubletail, rough doubletail (N.S.W.)
- Diuris protena D.L.Jones – northern golden moths (Vic.)
- Diuris pulchella D.L.Jones – beautiful donkey orchid (W.A.)
- Diuris punctata Sm. – purple donkey orchid (N.S.W., Qld., Vic.)
  - Diuris punctata var. punctata
  - Diuris punctata var. sulphurea Rupp
- Diuris purdiei Diels – Purdie's donkey orchid (W.A.)
- Diuris recurva D.L.Jones – mini donkey orchid (W.A.)
- Diuris refracta D.L.Jones & C.J.French – dainty donkey orchid (W.A.)
- Diuris secundiflora Fitzg. – one-sided donkey orchid (N.S.W.)
- Diuris segregata D.L.Jones & C.J.French – Northampton bee orchid (W.A.)
- Diuris semilunulata Messmer in H.M.R.Rupp – late leopard orchid (N.S.W., A.C.T., Vic.)
- Diuris septentrionalis D.L.Jones & C.J.French – northern bee orchid (W.A.)
- Diuris setacea R.Br. – bristly donkey orchid (W.A.)
- Diuris striata Rupp (N.S.W.)
- Diuris subalpina D.L.Jones – slender golden moths (N.S.W., A.C.T., Vic.)
- Diuris suffusa D.L.Jones & C.J.French – mottled donkey orchid (W.A.)
- Diuris sulphurea R.Br. – tiger orchid, hornet orchid (N.S.W., Qld., S.A., Tas., Vic.)
- Diuris systena D.L.Jones & L.M.Copel. – New England golden moths (N.S.W.)
- Diuris tinctoria D.L.Jones & C.J.French – sandplain donkey orchid (W.A.)
- Diuris tinkeri D.L.Jones & C.J.French – Arrowsmith pansy orchid (W.A.)
- Diuris tricolor Fitzg. – long-tailed donkey orchid, pine donkey orchid (N.S.W., Qld.)
- Diuris unica D.L.Jones (N.S.W., Qld.)
- Diuris venosa Rupp – veined doubletail (N.S.W.)

== Natural hybrids ==
- Diuris × fastidiosa R.S.Rogers 1927 (D. lanceolata × D. palustris)
- Diuris × nebulosa D.L.Jones 1991 (D. aurea × D. punctata)
- Diuris × palachila R.S.Rogers 1907 (D. behrii × D. pardina)
- Diuris × polymorpha Messmer in H.M.R.Rupp 1944 (D. lanceolata × D. platichila)
