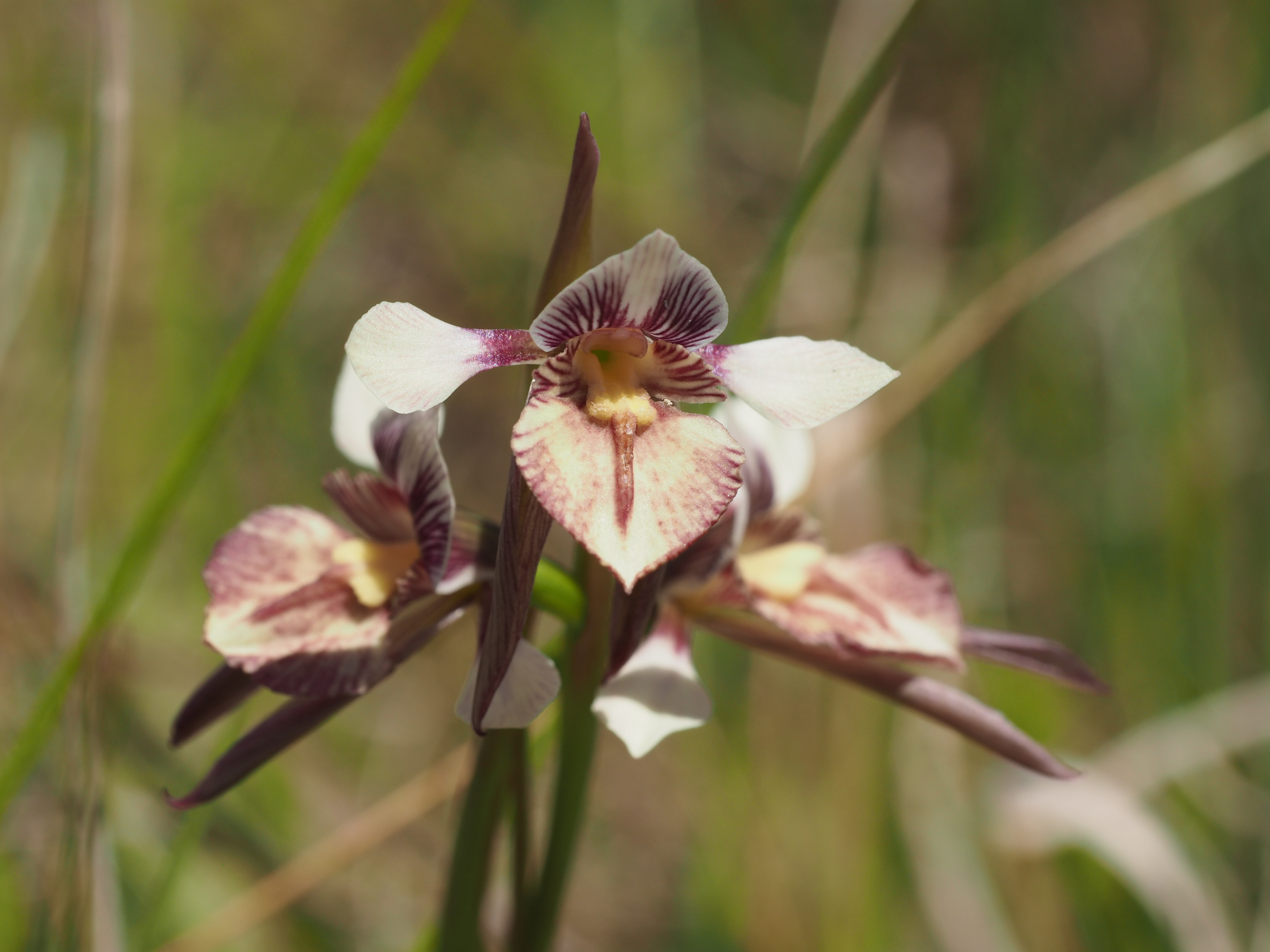
- Near Ebor

Conservation status
- Endangered (EPBC Act)

Scientific classification
- Kingdom: Plantae
- Clade: Embryophytes
- Clade: Tracheophytes
- Clade: Angiosperms
- Clade: Monocots
- Order: Asparagales
- Family: Orchidaceae
- Subfamily: Orchidoideae
- Tribe: Diurideae
- Genus: Diuris
- Species: D. eborensis

Binomial name
- Diuris eborensis D.L.Jones

= Diuris eborensis =

Species of orchid

Diuris eborensis is a species of orchid which is endemic to eastern Australia. It has up to six grass-like leaves and a flowering stem with up to four pale yellowish flowers with dark reddish purple streaks.

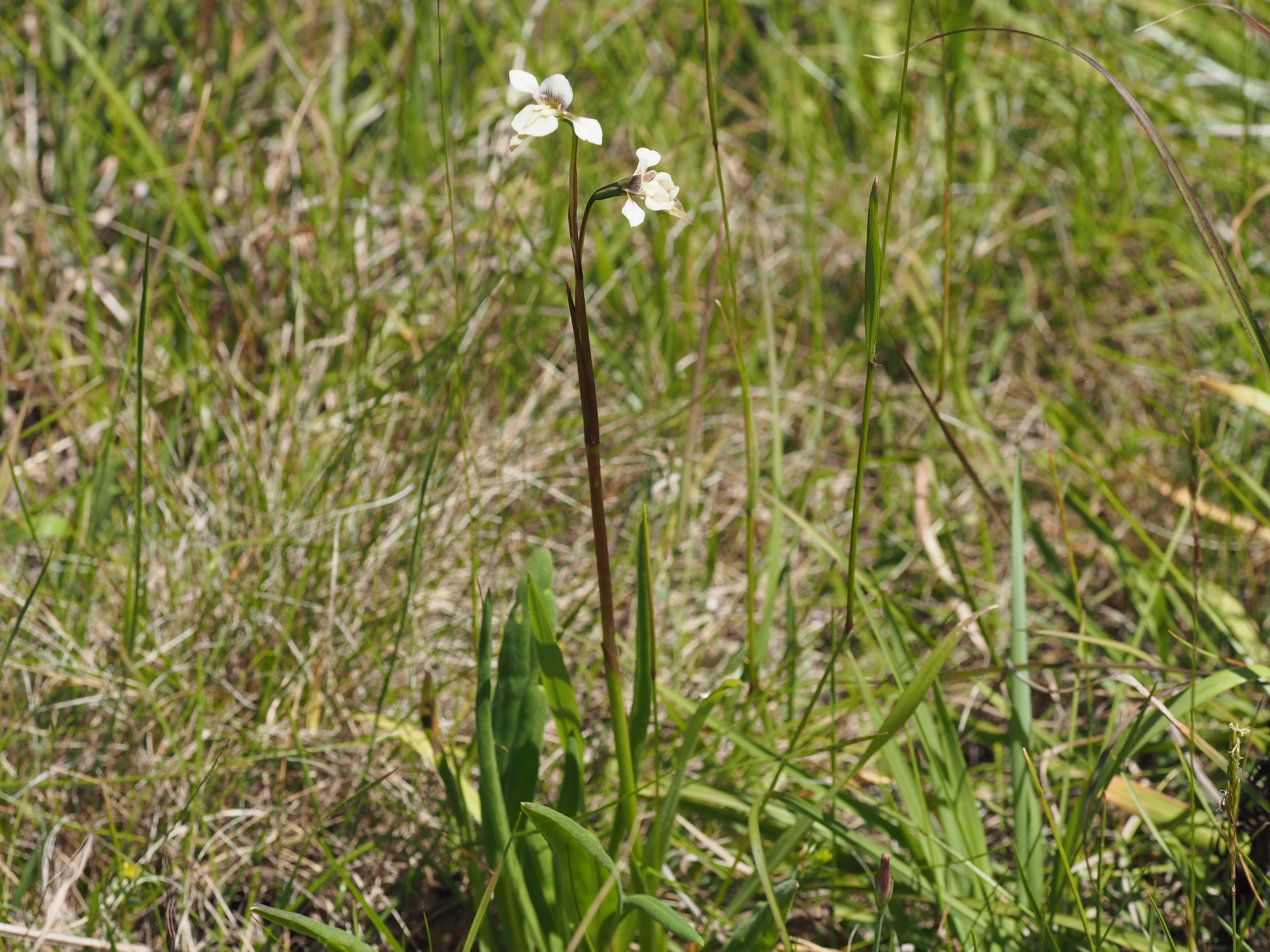
Diuris eborensis habit

== Description ==
Diuris eborensis is a tuberous, perennial herb with between three and six linear, grass-like leaves 70–300 mm (3–10 in) long, 3–6 mm (0.1–0.2 in) wide. Up to four flowers 18–23 mm (0.7–0.9 in) wide are borne on a flowering stem 150–350 mm (6–10 in) tall. The flowers are pale yellowish with dark reddish-purple streaks and striations and lean slightly forwards. The dorsal sepal is 8–12 mm (0.3–0.5 in) long, 6–9 mm (0.2–0.4 in) wide and directed upwards at an angle. The lateral sepals are 15–20 mm (0.6–0.8 in) long, 2.5–4 mm (0.1–0.2 in) wide, and turn slightly downwards. The petals are ear-like at the sides of the flower, 6–9 mm (0.2–0.4 in) long and 3–6 mm (0.1–0.2 in) wide on a purplish, stalk-like "claw" 5–6 mm (0.20–0.24 in) long. The labellum is 11–14 mm (0.4–0.6 in) long and has three lobes. The centre lobe is broad egg-shaped, 7–10 mm (0.3–0.4 in) long and 8–12 mm (0.3–0.5 in) wide and the side lobes are 3–5 mm (0.1–0.2 in) long and 2 mm (0.08 in) wide. The edges of the labellum are scalloped and there is a callus in its centre which has two short, broad ridges and a thin central ridge 5–8 mm (0.2–0.3 in) long. Flowering occurs from October to early December and the fruit which follows is a dehiscent capsule containing up to 500 seeds.

== Taxonomy and naming ==
Diuris eborensis was first formally described in 2006 by David Jones and the description was published in Australian Orchid Research from a specimen collected near Rigney Creek, west of Ebor.

== Distribution and habitat ==
This donkey orchid grows in moist, grassy places near streams in five locations on the New England Tableland.

== Conservation ==
Diuris eborensis is listed as "endangered" under the New South Wales Threatened Species Conservation Act 1995 and has been recommended for listing as "endangered" under the Australian Government Environment Protection and Biodiversity Conservation Act 1999. The main threats to the species include grazing and trampling by cattle, competition from weeds, camping, roadworks and dumping of waste.
