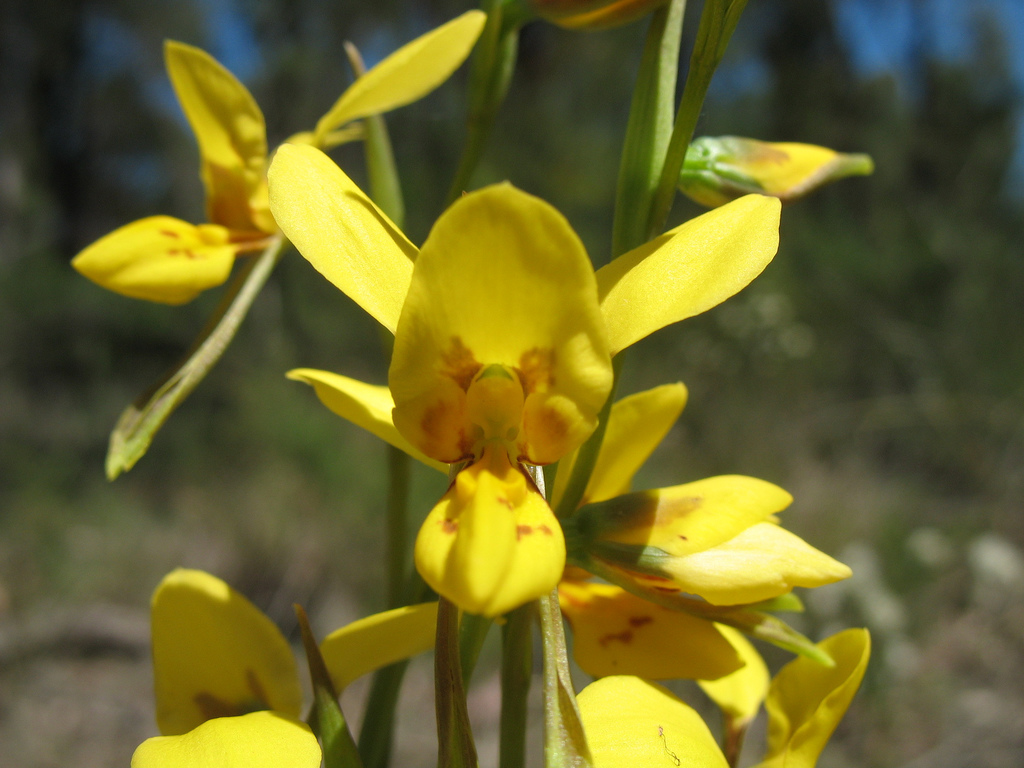
- Georges River, Australia

Scientific classification
- Kingdom: Plantae
- Clade: Tracheophytes
- Clade: Angiosperms
- Clade: Monocots
- Order: Asparagales
- Family: Orchidaceae
- Subfamily: Orchidoideae
- Tribe: Diurideae
- Genus: Diuris
- Species: D. aurea

Binomial name
- Diuris aurea Sm.

Synonyms
- Diuris aurea Sm. var. aurea; Diuris aurea var. obtusa Benth.; Diuris spathulata Sw.

= Diuris aurea =

Golden donkey orchid

Species of orchid

Diuris aurea, commonly known as the golden donkey orchid, is a species of orchid which is endemic to Australia, growing in New South Wales and Queensland. It has one or two leaves at the base and two to five golden-yellow to orange flowers with some darker markings.

== Description ==
Diuris aurea is a tuberous, perennial, terrestrial herb, usually growing to a height of 30–60 cm (10–20 in). There are one or two linear leaves, each 10–20 cm (4–8 in) long, 4–6 mm (0.16–0.24 in) wide and channelled.

There are between 2 and 5 golden yellow to orange flowers with some darker markings on the labellum and dorsal sepal. The flower is about 3.5 cm (1 in) wide. The dorsal sepal is broad egg-shaped, 8–15 mm (0.3–0.6 in) long and 7–14 mm (0.3–0.6 in) wide and erect. The lateral sepals are linear to spoon-shaped, 10–25 mm (0.4–1 in) long, 2–5 mm (0.08–0.2 in) wide and hang below the flower, usually parallel to each other. The petals are erect and spread, ear-like above the flower. They are broadly egg-shaped, 7–17 mm (0.3–0.7 in) long, 6–14 mm (0.2–0.6 in) wide on a dark coloured, stalk-like "claw", 5–8 mm (0.2–0.3 in). The labellum is 10–16 mm (0.4–0.6 in) long and is divided into three lobes. The lateral lobes are narrow elliptic to wedge-shaped, 4–6 mm (0.2–0.2 in) long, 2–4 mm (0.08–0.2 in) wide with a few teeth on their edge. The medial lobe is 7–13 mm (0.3–0.5 in) wide with a ridge along its centre line and there is a two-part callus 6–7 mm (0.2–0.3 in) long. Flowering occurs from August to November.

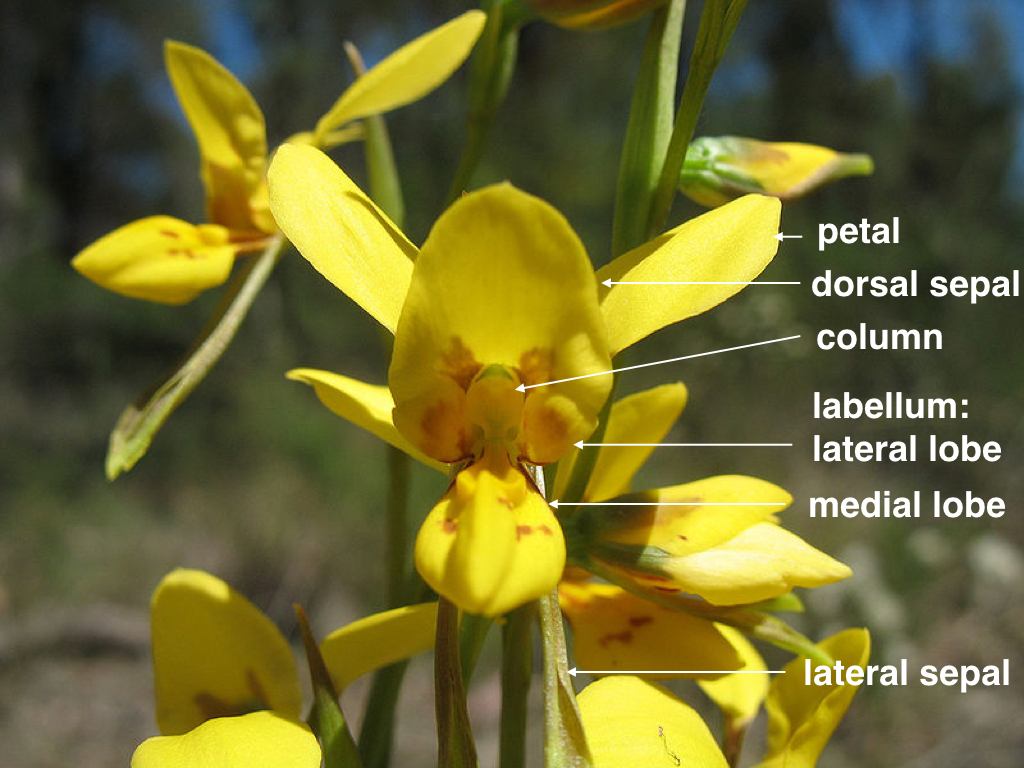
Labelled image

== Taxonomy and naming ==
Diuris aurea was first formally described in 1804 by James Edward Smith and the description was published in his book Exotic Botany (Volume 1). The specific epithet (aurea) is derived from the Latin word aurum meaning "gold".

== Distribution and habitat ==
In New South Wales, golden donkey orchid grows between Marulan and the Hunter Valley, growing in heathy and shrubby woodland and in grassy places in forest in areas near the coast. It also occurs in Queensland where its conservation status is "of least concern".
