= Diuris eburnea =

Arrowsmith bee orchid

Conservation status
- Priority One — Poorly Known Taxa (DEC)

Scientific classification
- Kingdom: Plantae
- Clade: Tracheophytes
- Clade: Angiosperms
- Clade: Monocots
- Order: Asparagales
- Family: Orchidaceae
- Subfamily: Orchidoideae
- Tribe: Diurideae
- Genus: Diuris
- Species: D. eburnea

Binomial name
- Diuris eburnea D.L.Jones

Species of orchid

Diuris eburnea, commonly known as Arrowsmith bee orchid, is a species of orchid that is endemic to the south-west of Western Australia. It has between four and six linear leaves and up to eight pale yellow to cream-coloured flowers with reddish markings. It is only known from near the Arrowsmith River north of Eneabba.

== Description ==
Diuris eburnea is a tuberous, perennial herb with between four and six linear leaves 120–200 mm (5–8 in) long, 1–3 mm (0.04–0.1 in) wide and folded lengthwise. Up to eight pale yellow to cream-coloured flowers with reddish markings, 20–30 mm (0.8–1 in) long and 12–15 mm (0.5–0.6 in) wide are borne on a flowering stem 200–450 mm (8–20 in) tall. The dorsal sepal is egg-shaped, 9–13 mm (0.4–0.5 in) long, 4–6.5 mm (0.2–0.3 in) wide and curves upwards. The lateral sepals are oblong, 9–14 mm (0.4–0.6 in) long, 2–3 mm (0.08–0.1 in) wide and turned downwards, parallel to or crossed over each other. The petals are more or less erect and spread apart from each other, egg-shaped to elliptic, 7–11 mm (0.3–0.4 in) long and 6–8 mm (0.2–0.3 in) wide on a purplish brown stalk 2.5–4 mm (0.1–0.2 in) long. The labellum is 9–12 mm (0.4–0.5 in) long, turns slightly downwards and has three lobes. The centre lobe is broadly egg-shaped to wedge-shaped, 8–11 mm (0.3–0.4 in) long and 7–10 mm (0.3–0.4 in) wide and the side lobes are egg-shaped with the narrower end towards the base, 4.5–6 mm (0.18–0.24 in) long and about 3 mm (0.1 in) wide. There are two callus ridges 4.5 mm (0.2 in) long near the mid-line of the labellum. Flowering occurs in October and November.

== Taxonomy and naming ==
Diuris eburnea was first formally described in 2006 by David Jones from a specimen collected north of Eneabba and the description was published in Australian Orchid Research. The specific epithet (eburnea) is a Latin word meaning "of ivory", referring to the colour of the flowers of this orchid.

== Distribution and habitat ==
Arrowsmith bee orchid grows in winter-wet areas on the banks of the Arrowsmith River in the Geraldton Sandplains biogeographic region.

== Conservation ==
Diuris eburnea is classified as "Priority One" by the Western Australian Government Department of Parks and Wildlife, meaning that it is known from only one or a few locations which are potentially at risk.
