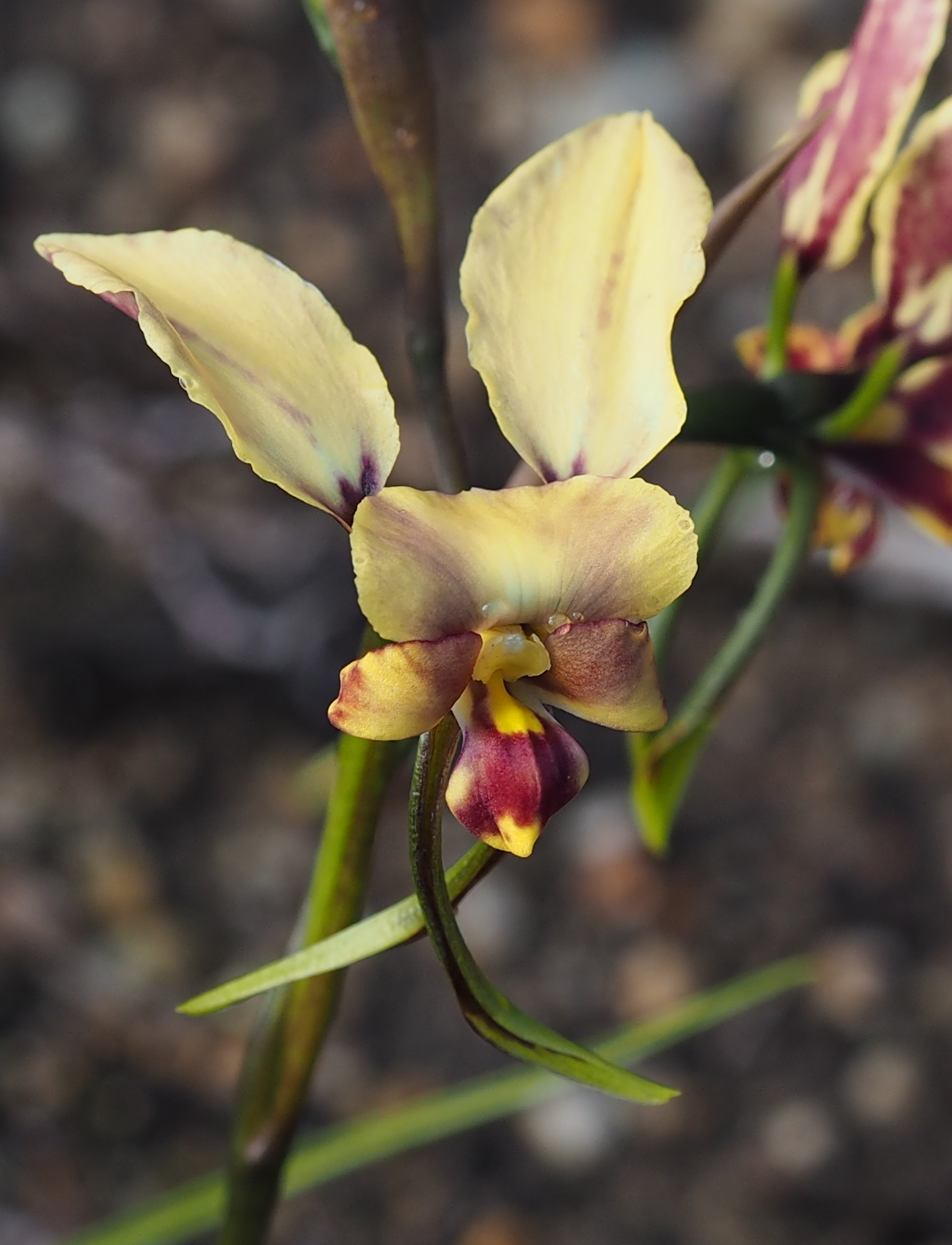
- On Mount Burdett, north of Esperance

Scientific classification
- Kingdom: Plantae
- Clade: Tracheophytes
- Clade: Angiosperms
- Clade: Monocots
- Order: Asparagales
- Family: Orchidaceae
- Subfamily: Orchidoideae
- Tribe: Diurideae
- Genus: Diuris
- Species: D. hazeliae

Binomial name
- Diuris hazeliae D.L.Jones & C.J.French

= Diuris hazeliae =

Yellow granite donkey orchid

Species of orchid

Diuris hazeliae, commonly known as yellow granite donkey orchid, is a species of orchid that is endemic to the south-west of Western Australia. It has between two and four linear leaves and up to six bright yellow and reddish-brown flowers.

== Description ==
Diuris hazeliae is a tuberous, perennial herb with between two and four linear leaves 100–300 mm (3.9–11.8 in) long and 4–7 mm (0.16–0.28 in) wide. Up to six bright yellow and reddish-brown flowers 35–55 mm (1.4–2.2 in) long and 25–35 mm (0.98–1.38 in) wide are borne on a flowering stem 150–400 mm (5.9–15.7 in) tall. The dorsal sepal is broadly elliptic, 11–15 mm (0.43–0.59 in) long and 15–20 mm (0.59–0.79 in) wide. The lateral sepals are narrowly oblong, 18–28 mm (0.71–1.10 in) long, 3–4 mm (0.12–0.16 in) wide, usually crossed and curved backwards. The petals are more or less erect and spread apart from each other, oblong to elliptic, 16–25 mm (0.63–0.98 in) long and 10–13 mm (0.39–0.51 in) wide on a blackish stalk 5–7 mm (0.20–0.28 in) long. The labellum is 8–11 mm (0.31–0.43 in) long with a strongly down-curved tip and has three lobes. The centre lobe is broadly wedge-shaped, 7–10 mm (0.28–0.39 in) long and 9–12 mm (0.35–0.47 in) wide and the side lobes spread widely apart and are oblong, 9–12 mm (0.35–0.47 in) long and 4.5–7 mm (0.18–0.28 in) wide. There is a single yellow callus ridge 5–7 mm (0.20–0.28 in) long surrounded by reddish brown mark, near the mid-line of the labellum. Flowering occurs from mid-August to September.

== Taxonomy and naming ==
Diuris hazeliae was first formally described in 2013 by David Jones and Christopher J. French in Australian Orchid Research, from a specimen collected at Tampu, near Karroun Hill Nature Reserve. The specific epithet (hazeliae) honours the plant collector Hazel King from the property "Kings Park", where the type specimens were collected.

== Distribution and habitat ==
Yellow granite donkey orchid grows on and around granite outcrops in a broad band between East Yuna, Paynes Find, Coolgardie, Norseman and Esperance, in the Avon Wheatbelt, Coolgardie, Geraldton Sandplains, Mallee and Yalgoo bioregions of south-western Western Australia.

== Conservation ==
Diuris hazeliae is listed as "not threatened" by the Western Australian Government Department of Biodiversity, Conservation and Attractions.
