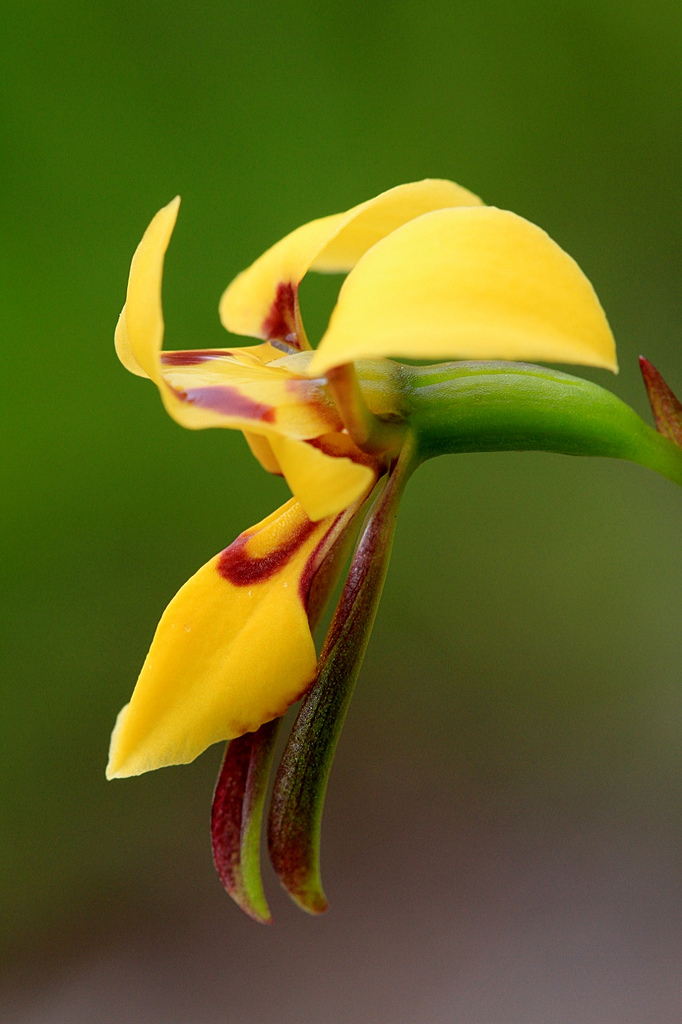

Scientific classification
- Kingdom: Plantae
- Clade: Tracheophytes
- Clade: Angiosperms
- Clade: Monocots
- Order: Asparagales
- Family: Orchidaceae
- Subfamily: Orchidoideae
- Tribe: Diurideae
- Genus: Diuris
- Species: D. brevifolia

Binomial name
- Diuris brevifolia R.S.Rogers

Synonyms
- Diuris sulphurea var. brevifolia (R.S.Rogers) J.Z.Weber & R.J.Bates

= Diuris brevifolia =

Short-leaved donkey orchid

Species of orchid

Diuris brevifolia, commonly known as the short-leaved donkey orchid, is a species of orchid which is endemic to South Australia. It has a few narrow, twisted leaves and a flowering stem with up to five bright yellow flowers with brown markings and relatively large, spreading lobes on the labellum. This is a relatively late-flowering species of donkey orchid.

== Description ==
Diuris brevifolia is a tuberous, perennial herb with between four and eight, often twisted leaves which are 70–120 mm (3–5 in) long and 3–4 mm (0.1–0.2 in) wide. Up to five bright yellow flowers 15–20 mm (0.6–0.8 in) wide are borne on a flowering stem 150–400 mm (6–20 in) tall. There are two brown spots on the base of the dorsal sepal and the labellum callus is outlined in brown. The dorsal sepal is erect or bent upwards, 12–15 mm (0.5–0.6 in) long, 6–7 mm (0.2–0.3 in) wide. The lateral sepals are greenish, linear to lance-shaped, 13–16 mm (0.5–0.6 in) long, 3–4 mm (0.1–0.2 in) wide and turn downwards, more or less parallel to each other. The petals are erect or curved backwards, have a dark brown stalk 4–6 mm (0.16–0.24 in) long with a blade 9–11 mm (0.35–0.43 in) long and 6–7 mm (0.2–0.3 in) wide. The labellum is egg-shaped, 12–15 mm (0.5–0.6 in) long and 7–8 mm (0.28–0.31 in) wide with side lobes 5–6 mm (0.20–0.24 in) long and about 3 mm (0.1 in) wide. There are two parallel ridge-like calli about 6–7 mm (0.2–0.3 in) long near the mid-line of the labellum. Flowering occurs from October to December.

== Taxonomy and naming ==
Diuris brevifolia was first formally described in 1922 by Richard Sanders Rogers who published his description in Transactions and Proceedings of the Royal Society of South Australia. The specific epithet (brevifolia) is derived from the Latin words brevis meaning "short" and folium meaning "leaf".

== Distribution and habitat ==
The short-leaved donkey orchid grows in a variety of habitats including heath, forest and woodland but is most common around the edges of swamps and river flats. It only occurs to the south of Adelaide and on Kangaroo Island.

== Conservation ==
There has been a large decline in the distribution and abundance of this donkey orchid in recent years and is listed as "endangered" in South Australia. The main threats to the species are incompatible land use and infrequent fire.
