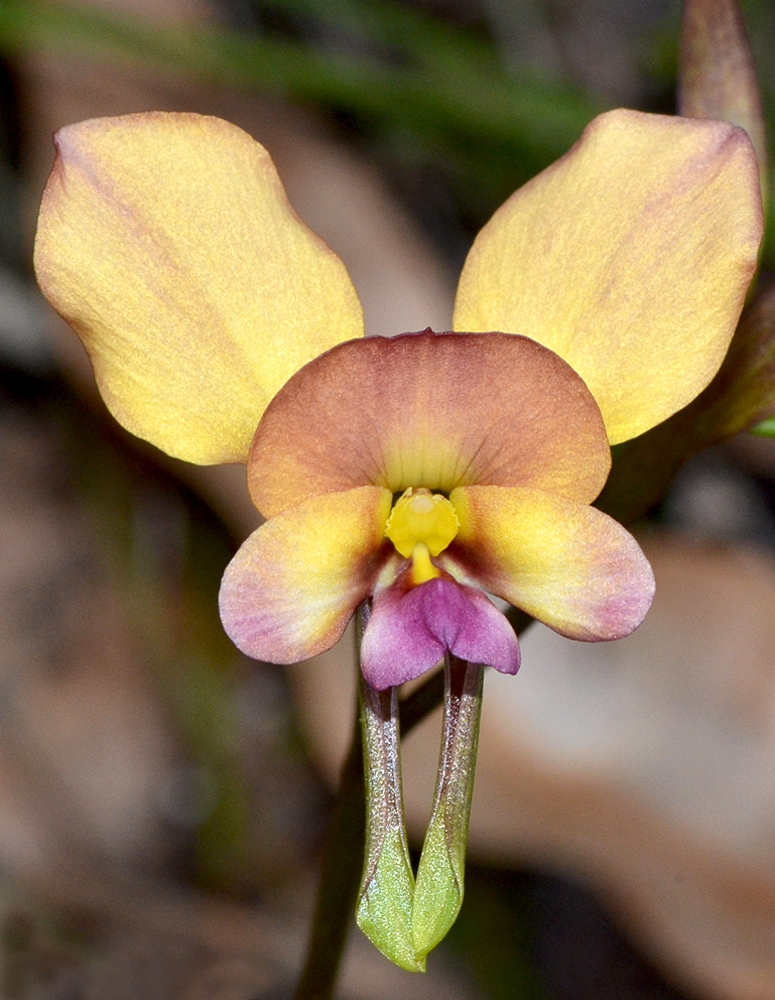

Scientific classification
- Kingdom: Plantae
- Clade: Tracheophytes
- Clade: Angiosperms
- Clade: Monocots
- Order: Asparagales
- Family: Orchidaceae
- Subfamily: Orchidoideae
- Tribe: Diurideae
- Genus: Diuris
- Species: D. ostrina

Binomial name
- Diuris ostrina D.L.Jones & C.J.French

= Diuris ostrina =

Darling Scarp donkey orchid

Species of orchid

Diuris ostrina, commonly known as Darling Scarp donkey orchid, is a species of orchid that is endemic to the south-west of Western Australia. It has two or three linear to lance-shaped leaves and up to five brown to brownish-yellow and purple-mauve flowers.

== Description ==
Diuris ostrina is a tuberous, perennial herb with two or three linear leaves 80–250 mm (3.1–9.8 in) long and 4–8 mm (0.16–0.31 in) wide. Up to five brown to brownish-yellow and purple-mauve flowers 32–42 mm (1.3–1.7 in) long and 25–35 mm (0.98–1.38 in) wide are borne on a flowering stem 250–400 mm (9.8–15.7 in) tall. The dorsal sepal is egg-shaped, 10–13 mm (0.39–0.51 in) long and 12–18 mm (0.47–0.71 in) wide, the lateral sepals narrowly oblong, parallel or crossed, 15–22 mm (0.59–0.87 in) long and 2.5–3.0 mm (0.098–0.118 in) wide. The petals are broadly elliptic, 15–18 mm (0.59–0.71 in) long and 9–14 mm (0.35–0.55 in) wide on a stalk 3–5 mm (0.12–0.20 in) long. The labellum is 8–12 mm (0.31–0.47 in) long with three lobes - the centre lobe broadly wedge-shaped, 8–12 mm (0.31–0.47 in) long and wide, the side lobes spread widely apart and egg-shaped to oblong, 9–12 mm (0.35–0.47 in) long and 4–6 mm (0.16–0.24 in) wide. There is a single smooth, yellow callus ridge 4–5 mm (0.16–0.20 in) long, along the mid-line of the labellum. Flowering occurs in October and November.

== Taxonomy and naming ==
Diuris ostrina was first formally described in 2016 by David Jones and Christopher J. French in Australian Orchid Review, from a specimen collected in Greenmount National Park in 1997. The specific epithet (ostrina) means "purple", referring to the main colour of the labellum of this species.

== Distribution and habitat ==
Darling Scarp donkey orchid is restricted to the Darling Scarp where it grows in shrubby forest and woodland in the Jarrah Forest and Swan Coastal Plain bioregions of south-western Western Australia.

== Conservation ==
Diuris ostrina is listed as "not threatened" by the Western Australian Government Department of Biodiversity, Conservation and Attractions.
