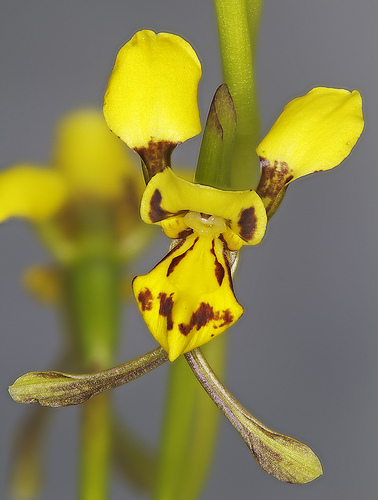

Scientific classification
- Kingdom: Plantae
- Clade: Tracheophytes
- Clade: Angiosperms
- Clade: Monocots
- Order: Asparagales
- Family: Orchidaceae
- Subfamily: Orchidoideae
- Tribe: Diurideae
- Genus: Diuris
- Species: D. chrysantha

Binomial name
- Diuris chrysantha D.L.Jones & M.A.Clem.

Synonyms
- Diuris sp. (Jollys Falls J.Loveday 31); Diuris sp. aff. chrysantha (North Coast); Diuris aurea auct. non Sm.: Bailey, F.M. (1902)

= Diuris chrysantha =

Granite donkey orchid

Species of orchid

Diuris chrysantha, commonly known as granite donkey orchid, is a species of orchid that is endemic to eastern Australia. It has one or two leaves and up to seven deep golden to orange-coloured flowers with brown markings and occurs on the ranges and tablelands north from Tamworth to the Darling Downs.

== Description ==
Diuris chrysantha is a tuberous, perennial herb with one or two linear leaves 120–360 mm (5–10 in) long, 4–8 mm (0.2–0.3 in) wide and folded lengthwise. Between two and seven deep golden to orange-coloured flowers with brown markings and 18–20 mm (0.7–0.8 in) wide are borne on a flowering stem 150–320 mm (6–10 in) tall. The dorsal sepal is erect, egg-shaped, 7–9 mm (0.3–0.4 in) long and 6–7 mm (0.2–0.3 in) wide. The lateral sepals are linear to spatula-shaped, 12–18 mm (0.5–0.7 in) long, 2–4 mm (0.08–0.2 in) wide and turned downwards. The petals are more or less circular in shape, 6–8 mm (0.2–0.3 in) long and wide on a brown stalk 4–7 mm (0.2–0.3 in) long and held ear-like above the rest of the flower. The labellum is 7–9 mm (0.3–0.4 in) long and has three lobes. The centre lobe is heart-shaped to wedge shaped, 5–7 mm (0.2–0.3 in) long and 4–6 mm (0.16–0.24 in) wide and the side lobes are egg-shaped, 2.5–4 mm (0.1–0.2 in) long and 2.5–3 mm (0.098–0.12 in) wide. There are two callus ridges 2–3 mm (0.08–0.1 in) long and spreading apart from each other near the mid-line of the labellum. Flowering occurs from August to November.

== Taxonomy and naming ==
Diuris chrysantha was first formally described in 1987 by David Jones and Mark Clements from a specimen collected near Stanthorpe and the description was published in Proceedings of the Royal Society of Queensland. The specific epithet (chrysantha) is derived from the Ancient Greek words chrysos meaning "gold" and anthos meaning "flower".

== Distribution and habitat ==
The granite donkey orchid grows in grassy forest on the ranges and tablelands north from Tamworth to the Darling Downs.
