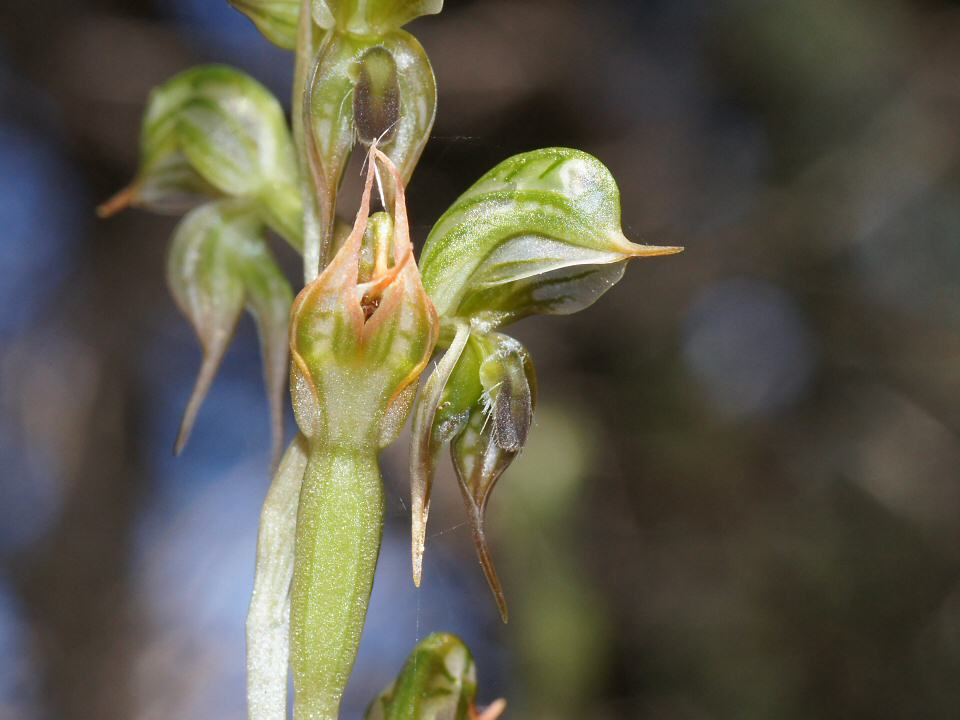
- Pterostylis aciculiformis growing in the Grampians National Park

Scientific classification
- Kingdom: Plantae
- Clade: Tracheophytes
- Clade: Angiosperms
- Clade: Monocots
- Order: Asparagales
- Family: Orchidaceae
- Subfamily: Orchidoideae
- Tribe: Cranichideae
- Genus: Pterostylis
- Species: P. aciculiformis

Binomial name
- Pterostylis aciculiformis (Nicholls) D.L.Jones & M.A.Clem.

Synonyms
- Oligochaetochilus aciculiformis (Nicholls) Szlach.; Pterostylis aciculiformis D.L.Jones nom. inval.; Pterostylis pusilla var. aciculiformis Nicholls; Pterostylis rufa subsp. aciculiformis (Nicholls) Blackmore & Clemesha; Pterostylis sp. aff. aciculiformis (Stawell)

= Pterostylis aciculiformis =

Needle-point rustyhood

Species of orchid

Pterostylis aciculiformis, commonly known as the needle-point rustyhood or slender ruddyhood, is a plant in the orchid family Orchidaceae and is endemic to south-eastern Australia. It has a rosette of leaves and up to ten green and brown flowers with a brown, insect-like labellum. It is widespread and locally common in New South Wales and Victoria, growing mostly in drier forests.

== Description ==
Pterostylis aciculiformis, is a terrestrial, perennial, deciduous, herb with an underground tuber. It has a rosette of between five and twelve leaves at the base of the flowering spike, each leaf 10–30 mm (0.4–1 in) long and 6–12 mm (0.2–0.5 in) wide. Up to twelve green and brown flowers 13–16 mm (0.5–0.6 in) long and 5 mm (0.2 in) wide are borne on a flowering spike 100–250 mm (4–10 in) tall. Three to six stem leaves are wrapped around the flowering spike. The dorsal sepal and petals form a hood over the column with the dorsal sepal having an upturned point about 3 mm (0.1 in) long. The lateral sepals turn downwards, curve forwards and are narrower than the hood. They have thread-like tips 4–6 mm (0.16–0.24 in) long and are more or less parallel to each other. The labellum is brown, fleshy and insect-like, about 4 mm (0.2 in) long and 2 mm (0.08 in) wide. The "head" end is swollen, there are 6 to 12 white bristles on each side and many short bristles on the "tail" end. Flowering occurs from September to December.

== Taxonomy and naming ==
The needle-point rustyhood was first formally described in 1936 by William Nicholls who gave it the name Pterostylis pusilla var. aciculiformis and published the description in The Victorian Naturalist. In 1989, Mark Clements and David Jones raised it to species status. The specific epithet (aciculiformis) is derived from the Latin word acicula meaning "a small pin" and the suffix -formis.

== Distribution and habitat ==
Pterostylis aciculiformis occurs in disjunct populations south from Wellington in New South Wales and across northern Victoria, growing mostly in drier forests in stony soils. It may also occur in far eastern South Australia.
