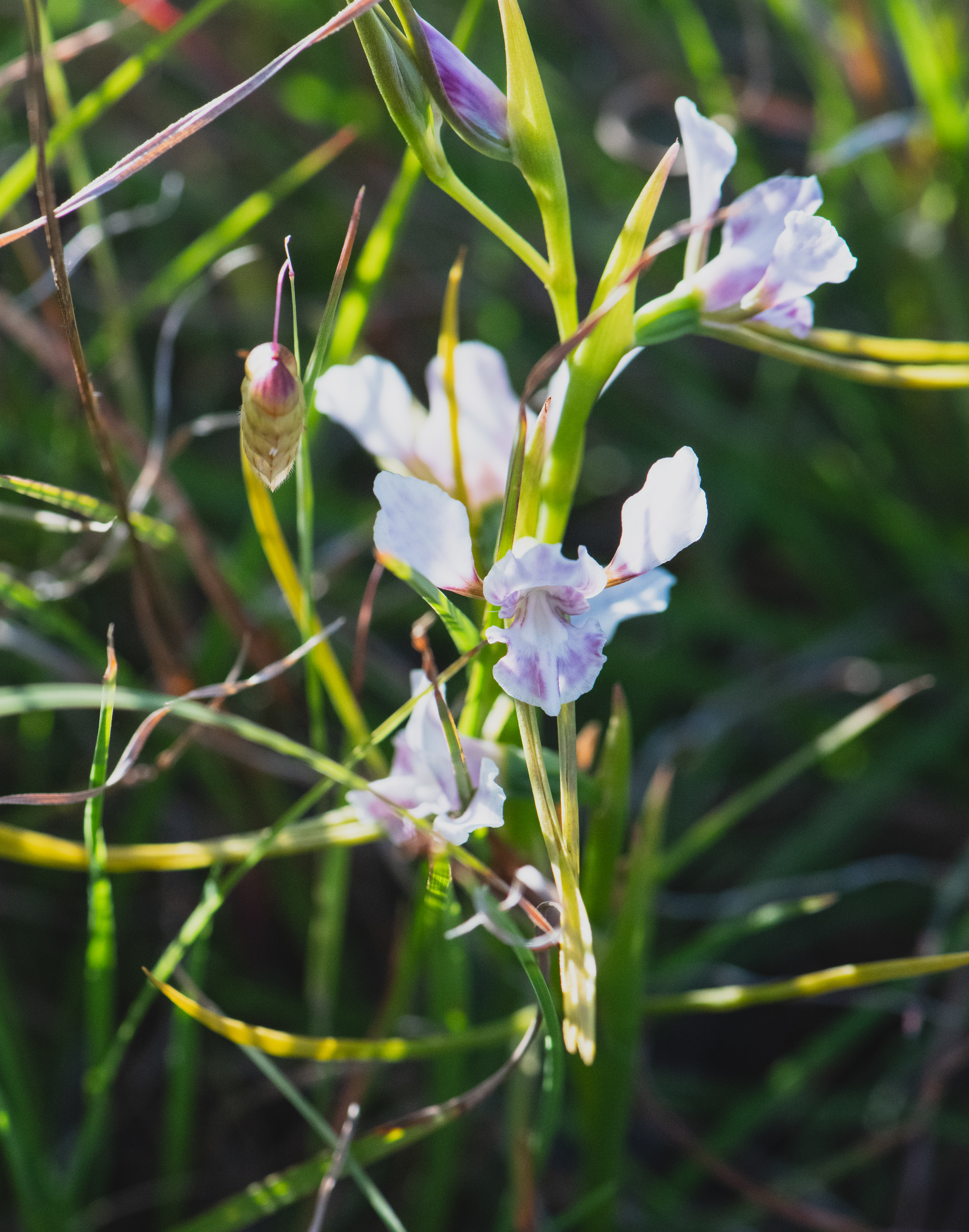

Conservation status
- Endangered (EPBC Act)

Scientific classification
- Kingdom: Plantae
- Clade: Tracheophytes
- Clade: Angiosperms
- Clade: Monocots
- Order: Asparagales
- Family: Orchidaceae
- Subfamily: Orchidoideae
- Tribe: Diurideae
- Genus: Diuris
- Species: D. fragrantissima

Binomial name
- Diuris fragrantissima D.L.Jones & M.A.Clem.

= Diuris fragrantissima =

Fragrant doubletail

Species of orchid

Diuris fragrantissima, commonly called fragrant doubletail or Sunshine diuris, is a species of orchid which is endemic to a small area to the west of Melbourne. It has two linear leaves at its base and up to twelve white flowers with mauve or pale purple markings with unusually long lateral sepals. Only about thirty plants survive in grassland near Sunshine.

== Description ==
Diuris fragrantissima is a tuberous, perennial herb with two linear leaves 100–180 mm (4–7 in) long, 5–10 mm (0.2–0.4 in) wide and folded lengthwise. Up to twelve white flowers with mauve or pale purple markings, 30–35 mm (1.2–1.4 in) wide are borne on a flowering stem 100–200 mm (4–8 in) tall. The dorsal sepal is erect, egg-shaped, 12–15 mm (0.5–0.6 in) long and 8–12 mm (0.3–0.5 in) wide. The lateral sepals are narrow lance-shaped, 50–85 mm (2–3 in) long, about 2 mm (0.08 in) wide, turned downwards at an angle and almost parallel to each other. The petals are erect or turned backwards with an elliptic or egg-shaped blade 9–12 mm (0.4–0.5 in) long and 6–8 mm (0.2–0.3 in) wide on a green stalk 5–8 mm (0.2–0.3 in) long. The labellum is 9–12 mm (0.4–0.5 in) long and has three lobes. The centre lobe is fan-shaped or heart-shaped, 8–10 mm (0.3–0.4 in) long, 7–10 mm (0.3–0.4 in) wide with a raised ridge along its midline and wrinkled edges. The side lobes are erect, irregularly shaped, 3.5–5 mm (0.1–0.2 in) long and about 2 mm (0.08 in) wide. There are two ridge-like calli 4–5 mm (0.16–0.20 in) long near the base of the mid-line of the base of the labellum. Flowering occurs in October and November.

== Taxonomy and naming ==
Fragrant doubletail was first formally described in 1964 by Alick Dockrill from an unpublished description by Herman Rupp and given the name Diuris punctata var. albo-violacea. The description was published in The Victorian Naturalist. In 1989 David Jones and Mark Clements changed the name to D. fragrantissima noting that it differs from D. punctata in "having a dwarf habit, the stiff, erect habit of the flowers that are white with purple markings, and its strong fragrance". The specific epithet (fragrantissima) is the superlative form of the Latin word fragrans meaning "smelling agreeably".

== Distribution and habitat ==
At the time of European settlement, D. fragrantissima was plentiful in the grasslands to the west of Melbourne, but as early as 1934, W.H. Nicholls noted that it had become scarce. The population continued to decline until only one plant survived in the wild in 1992. About thirty wild plants of Diuris fragrantissima survive in grassland near Sunshine and others have been introduced to a small reserve near Altona. The populations at both Sunshine and Altona are under great stress due to the encroachment of industrial and residential development. Ecological processes such as the loss of natural pollinators also threaten this species. About 200 individuals survive in cultivation, mostly at Melbourne Zoo and the Royal Botanic Gardens Victoria.

== Conservation ==
Diuris fragrantissima is classified as "endangered" under the Australian Government Environment Protection and Biodiversity Conservation Act 1999 and the Victorian Government Flora and Fauna Guarantee Act 1988. The main threats to the species are weed invasion, predation, especially by the introduced house mouse (Mus musculus), altered fire regimes and human interference.
