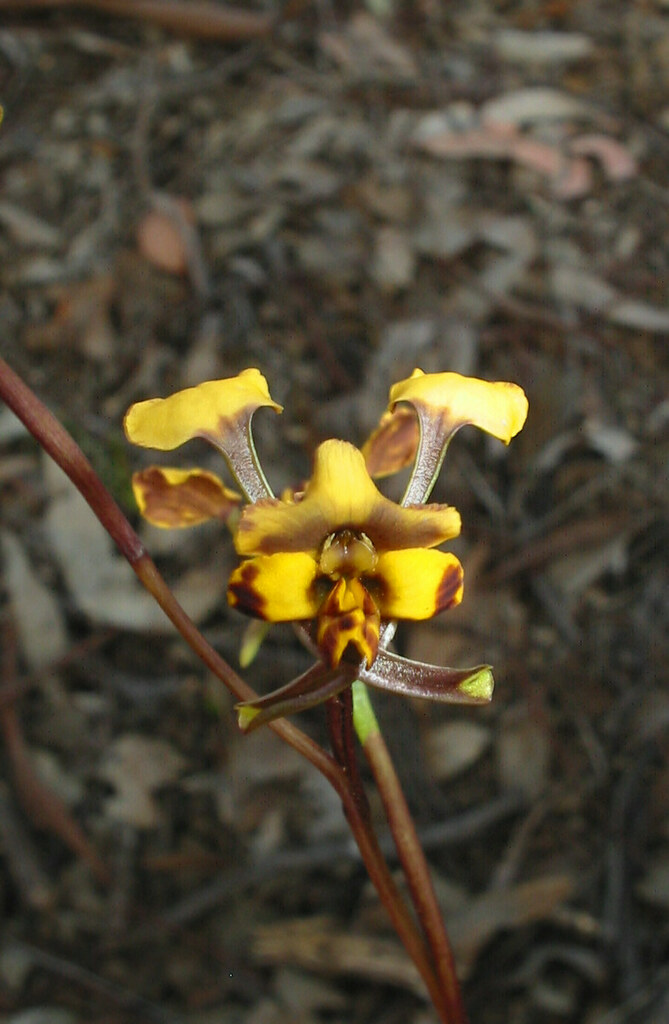

Scientific classification
- Kingdom: Plantae
- Clade: Tracheophytes
- Clade: Angiosperms
- Clade: Monocots
- Order: Asparagales
- Family: Orchidaceae
- Subfamily: Orchidoideae
- Tribe: Diurideae
- Genus: Diuris
- Species: D. brevissima

Binomial name
- Diuris brevissima Fitzg. ex Nicholls

Synonyms
- Diuris brevissima Nicholls nom. inval.; Diuris brevissima Rupp nom. inval., nom. nud.

= Diuris brevissima =

Species of orchid

Diuris brevissima is a species of orchid which is endemic to New South Wales. It has two folded leaves and up to nine light yellow flowers with reddish-brown markings. It is a poorly known species that has only been recorded in the Blue Mountains.

== Description ==
Diuris brevissima is a tuberous, perennial herb with two linear leaves about 300 mm (10 in) long, 6 mm (0.2 in) wide and folded lengthwise. Between two and nine light yellow flowers with reddish-brown markings, about 20 mm (0.8 in) wide are borne on a flowering stem up to 350 mm (10 in) tall. The dorsal sepal is erect, broadly egg-shaped, 8–10 mm (0.3–0.4 in) long and 6–8 mm (0.2–0.3 in) wide. The lateral sepals are linear, about 10 mm (0.4 in) long, 2.5 mm (0.1 in) wide, turned downwards and parallel to each other. The petals have a broad egg-shaped to almost circular blade on a dark coloured stalk. The labellum is 6–8 mm (0.2–0.3 in) long and has three lobes. The centre lobe is egg-shaped with the narrower end towards the base, 6–8 mm (0.2–0.3 in) long and the side lobes are oblong to wedge-shaped, 6–8 mm (0.2–0.3 in) long and 2–3 mm (0.08–0.1 in) wide. There are two ridge-like calli about 3 mm (0.1 in) in the mid-line of the labellum. Flowering occurs in October.

== Taxonomy and naming ==
In 1939, William Henry Nicholls published a description of Diuris brevissima in The Victorian Naturalist, relying on printed but unpublished colour drawings of Robert D. FitzGerald of a specimen collected at Lawson. However Nicholls did not include a Latin description and therefore did not comply with the rules of nomenclature. In 1942 Nicholls formally described the species in a later edition of The Victorian Naturalist. The specific epithet (brevissima) is a Latin word meaning "shortest".

== Distribution and habitat ==
Diuris brevissima is a poorly known species from the Blue Mountains where it grows in forest. Although in his 1939 publication, Nicholls refers to collections of this orchid from Ararat in Victoria, D. brevissima does not occur in that state.
