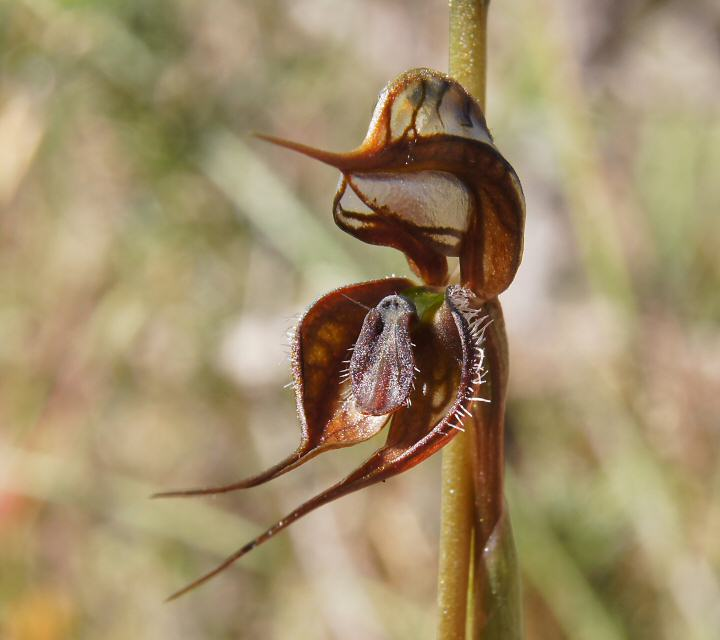

Scientific classification
- Kingdom: Plantae
- Clade: Tracheophytes
- Clade: Angiosperms
- Clade: Monocots
- Order: Asparagales
- Family: Orchidaceae
- Subfamily: Orchidoideae
- Tribe: Cranichideae
- Genus: Pterostylis
- Species: P. maxima

Binomial name
- Pterostylis maxima D.L.Jones & M.A.Clem.

Synonyms
- Oligochaetochilus maximus (D.L.Jones & M.A.Clem.) Szlach.

= Pterostylis maxima =

Large rustyhood

Species of orchid

Pterostylis maxima, commonly known as the large rustyhood, is a plant in the orchid family Orchidaceae and is endemic to south-eastern Australia. It has a rosette of leaves at its base and up to eight relatively large, dark brown flowers with transparent "windows" and a thin, dark insect-like labellum.

== Description ==
Pterostylis maxima, is a terrestrial, perennial, deciduous, herb with an underground tuber. It has a rosette of between six and twelve egg-shaped leaves at the base of the flowering spike, each leaf 15–45 mm (0.6–2 in) long and 10–18 mm (0.4–0.7 in) wide. Between two and eight dark reddish-brown flowers with transparent sections, each flower 35–60 mm (1–2 in) long and 12–14 mm (0.5–0.6 in) wide are borne on a flowering spike 200–350 mm (8–10 in) tall. Four to six stem leaves are wrapped around the flowering spike. The dorsal sepal and petals are joined to form a hood called the "galea" over the column with the dorsal sepal having a thread-like tip 7–12 mm (0.3–0.5 in) long. The lateral sepals are wider than the galea, dished, densely hairy on their outer edges and suddenly taper to thread-like tips 25–35 mm (0.98–1.4 in) long and parallel to each other. The labellum is reddish-brown, thin and insect-like, 6–8 mm (0.2–0.3 in) long and about 4 mm (0.2 in) wide. The "head" end is swollen with two long bristles and there are up to 8 to 12 shorter bristles on each side of the "body". Flowering occurs from October to November.

== Taxonomy and naming ==
Pterostylis maxima was first formally described in 1989 by David Jones and Mark Clements from a specimen collected near Bendigo and the description was published in Australian Orchid Research. The specific epithet (maxima) is a Latin word meaning "greatest" or "largest".

== Distribution and habitat ==
The large rustyhood occurs in scattered populations south from Temora in New South Wales and across Victoria to the south-east bioregion of South Australia. It grows in woodland, open forest and mallee.

== Conservation ==
Pterostylis maxima is described as "vulnerable" in Victoria and as "endangered" in South Australia.
