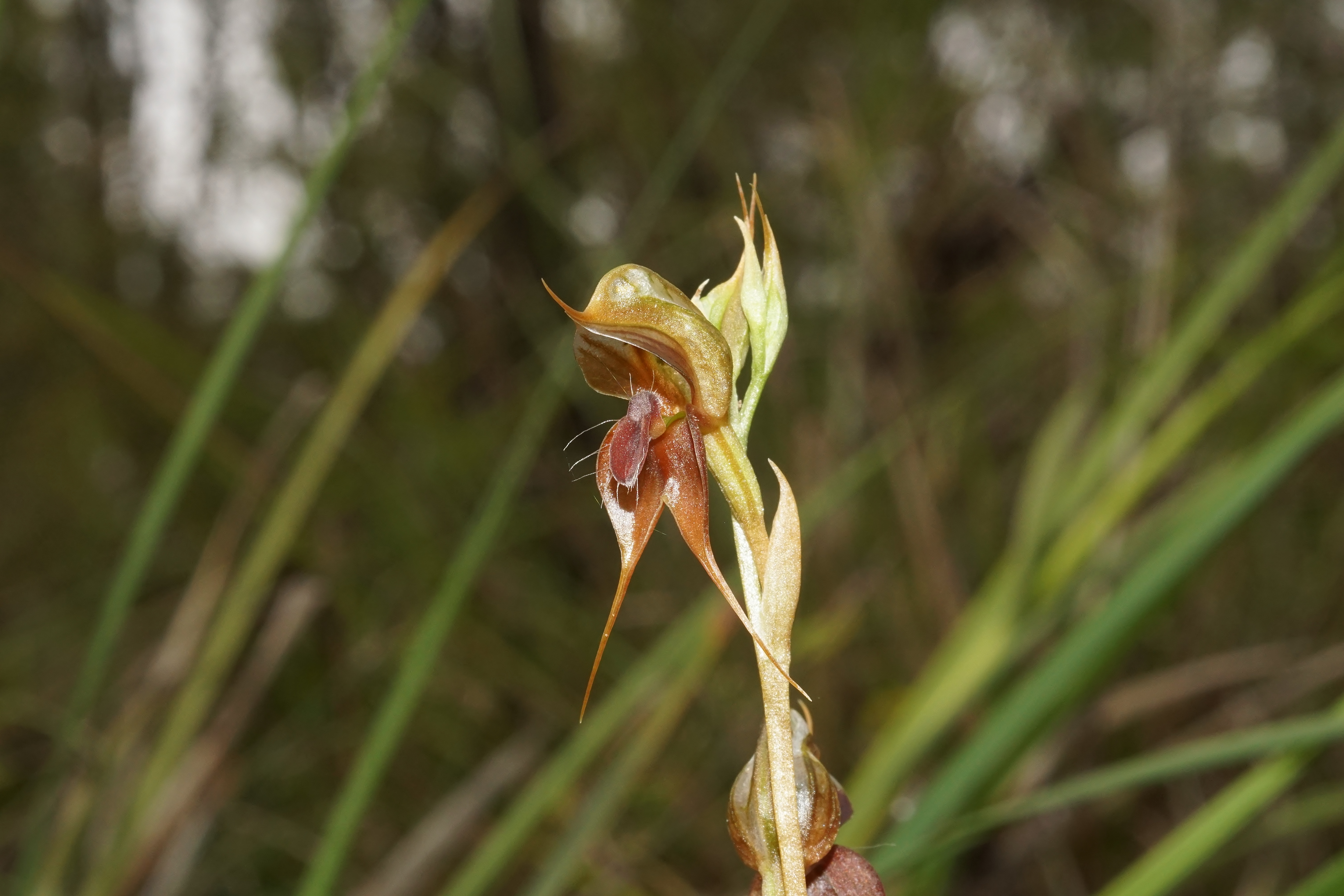

Scientific classification
- Kingdom: Plantae
- Clade: Embryophytes
- Clade: Tracheophytes
- Clade: Angiosperms
- Clade: Monocots
- Order: Asparagales
- Family: Orchidaceae
- Subfamily: Orchidoideae
- Tribe: Cranichideae
- Genus: Pterostylis
- Species: P. chaetophora

Binomial name
- Pterostylis chaetophora M.A.Clem. & D.L.Jones

Synonyms
- Oligochaetochilus chaetophorus (M.A.Clem. & D.L.Jones) Szlach.

= Pterostylis chaetophora =

Taree rustyhood

Species of orchid

Pterostylis chaetophora, commonly known as the Taree rustyhood, tall rusthood or ruddy hood is a plant in the orchid family Orchidaceae and is endemic to eastern Australia. It has a rosette of leaves at its base and up to twelve reddish-brown flowers with translucent "windows" and a fleshy, reddish-brown, bristly, insect-like labellum.

== Description ==
Pterostylis chaetophora, is a terrestrial, perennial, deciduous, herb with an underground tuber. It has a rosette of between six and nine egg-shaped leaves 10–35 mm (0.4–1 in) long and 8–15 mm (0.3–0.6 in) wide. Flowering plants have a rosette at the base of the flowering spike but the leaves are usually withered by flowering time. Up to twelve reddish-brown flowers with translucent panels and 30–37 mm (1.2–1.5 in) long, 7–9 mm (0.3–0.4 in) wide are borne on a flowering spike 150–350 mm (6–10 in) tall. The flowers lean forward and there are three to five stem leaves wrapped around the flowering spike. The dorsal sepal and petals form a hood or "galea" over the column with the dorsal sepal having a narrow tip 5–8 mm (0.2–0.3 in) long. The lateral sepals turn downwards, are about the same width as the galea and suddenly taper to narrow tips 13–20 mm (0.5–0.8 in) long which spread apart from each other. The labellum is fleshy, reddish-brown and insect-like, about 6 mm (0.2 in) long and 3 mm (0.1 in) wide with a channel along its mid-line. The "head" end has many short hairs and the "body" has ten to thirteen hairs up to 4 mm (0.2 in) long on each side. Flowering occurs from August to November.

== Taxonomy and naming ==
Pterostylis chaetophora was first formally described in 1989 by Mark Clements and David Jones from a specimen collected near Abermain and the description was published in Australian Orchid Research. The specific epithet (chaetophora) is derived from the Ancient Greek word chaite meaning "long hair" and the suffix -phorus meaning "-bearing".

== Distribution and habitat ==
The Taree rustyhood grows in forest with grasses and shrubs in the Taree district and in Queensland.

== Conservation ==
Pterostylis chaetophora is listed as "vulnerable" under the New South Wales Threatened Species Conservation Act 1995. The main threats to the species are weed invasion, habitat loss and disturbance from road works, rubbish dumping and uncontrolled vehicle access.
