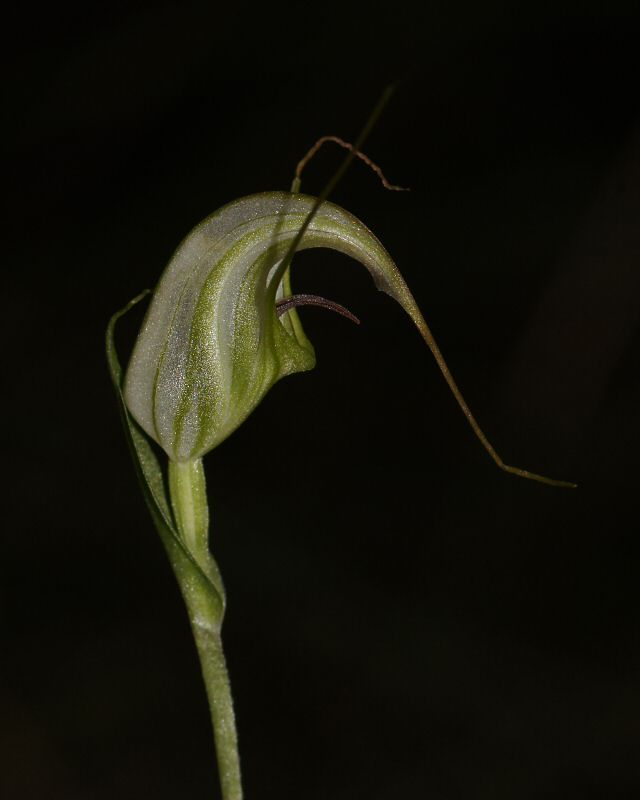

Conservation status
- Vulnerable (EPBC Act)

Scientific classification
- Kingdom: Plantae
- Clade: Tracheophytes
- Clade: Angiosperms
- Clade: Monocots
- Order: Asparagales
- Family: Orchidaceae
- Subfamily: Orchidoideae
- Tribe: Cranichideae
- Genus: Pterostylis
- Species: P. tenuissima

Binomial name
- Pterostylis tenuissima Nicholls

Synonyms
- Diplodium tenuissimum (Nicholls) D.L.Jones & M.A.Clem.

= Pterostylis tenuissima =

Swamp greenhood

Species of orchid

Pterostylis tenuissima, commonly known as swamp greenhood, is a species of orchid endemic to the southern mainland of Australia. As with similar greenhoods, the flowering plants differ from those which are not flowering. The non-flowering plants have a rosette of leaves flat on the ground but the flowering plants have a single flower with leaves on the flowering spike. This greenhood has small translucent white flowers with dark green stripes and markings and both the dorsal sepal and lateral sepals have relatively long, thread-like tips.

== Description ==
Pterostylis tenuissima is a terrestrial, perennial, deciduous, herb with an underground tuber and when not flowering, a rosette of egg-shaped leaves lying close to the ground, each leaf 3–20 mm (0.1–0.8 in) long and 2–7 mm (0.08–0.3 in) wide. Flowering plants have a single flower 12–15 mm (0.5–0.6 in) long and 6–8 mm (0.2–0.3 in) wide borne on a flowering stem 100–300 mm (4–10 in) mm high with between three and seven stem leaves. The flowers are translucent white with dark green stripes and markings. The dorsal sepal and petals are fused, forming a hood or "galea" over the column. The dorsal sepal curves forward and downward with a thread-like tip 10–15 mm (0.4–0.6 in) long. The lateral sepals are held closely against the galea with erect, thread-like tips 20–25 mm (0.8–1 in) long. The sinus between the lateral sepals bulges forward and has a V-shaped notch in the centre. The labellum is 6–8 mm (0.2–0.3 in) long, about 2 mm (0.08 in) wide, dark brown, slightly curved and protrudes above the sinus. Flowering occurs from October to February.

== Taxonomy and naming ==
Pterostylis tenuissima was first formally described in 1950 by William Nicholls from a specimen collected near Nelson and the description was published in The Victorian Naturalist. The specific epithet (tenuissima) is the superlative form of the Latin word tenuis meaning "thin", hence "thinnest".

== Distribution and habitat ==
Swamp greenhood occurs in the far south-eastern corner of South Australia and south-western Victoria with a disjunct population on Wilsons Promontory. It grows in swampy mud under dense thickets of woolly tea-tree (Leptospermum lanigerum) and scented paperbark (Melaleuca squarrosa), sometimes forming large colonies.

== Conservation ==
Pterostylis tenuissima is listed as "vulnerable" under the Australian Government Environment Protection and Biodiversity Conservation Act 1999 and the Victorian Government Flora and Fauna Guarantee Act 1988. Threats to the species include land clearing, grazing by livestock, draining of wetland and weed invasion.
