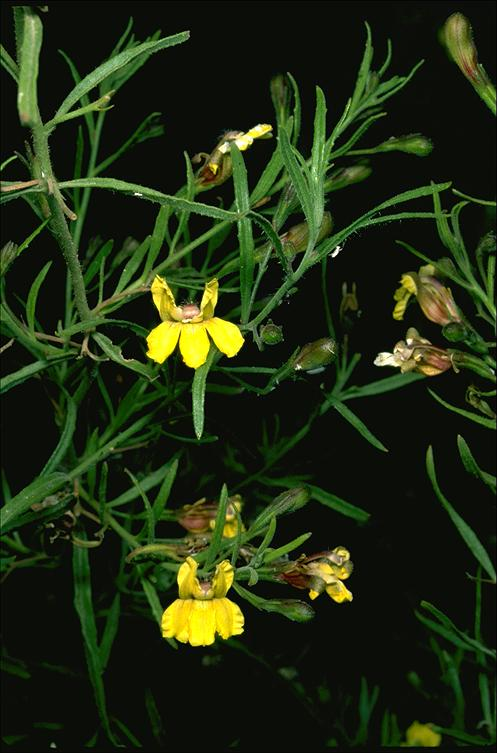
- In the ANBG

Scientific classification
- Kingdom: Plantae
- Clade: Tracheophytes
- Clade: Angiosperms
- Clade: Eudicots
- Clade: Asterids
- Order: Asterales
- Family: Goodeniaceae
- Genus: Goodenia
- Species: G. stephensonii

Binomial name
- Goodenia stephensonii F.Muell. ex Benth.

= Goodenia stephensonii =

Species of plant

Goodenia stephensonii is a species of flowering plant in the family Goodeniaceae and is endemic to eastern New South Wales. It is an erect, more or less woody herb with linear to oblong stem leaves and racemes of yellow flowers with a pouched corolla.

== Description ==
Goodenia stephensonii is an erect, more or less woody herb that typically grows to a height of up to 80 cm (31 in). The leaves on the stems are linear to oblong, 30–60 mm (1.2–2.4 in) long and about 3.5 mm (0.14 in) wide, sometimes with teeth on the edges. The flowers are arranged in racemes up to 200 mm (7.9 in) long on a peduncle 8–12 mm (0.31–0.47 in) long with leaf-like bracts and linear bracteoles 2–3 mm (0.079–0.118 in) long. The sepals are linear to lance-shaped, about 2 mm (0.079 in) long, the corolla yellow and pouched, 10–15 mm (0.39–0.59 in) long. The lower lobes of the corolla are 3–4 mm (0.12–0.16 in) long with wings about 0.5 mm (0.020 in) wide. Flowering occurs from October to January.

== Taxonomy and naming ==
Goodenia stephensonii was first formally described in 1887 by Ferdinand von Mueller in The Victorian Naturalist from specimens collected by "L. Stephenson".

== Distribution ==
This goodenia grows in forest and woodland between Gosford and the upper Hunter Valley.
