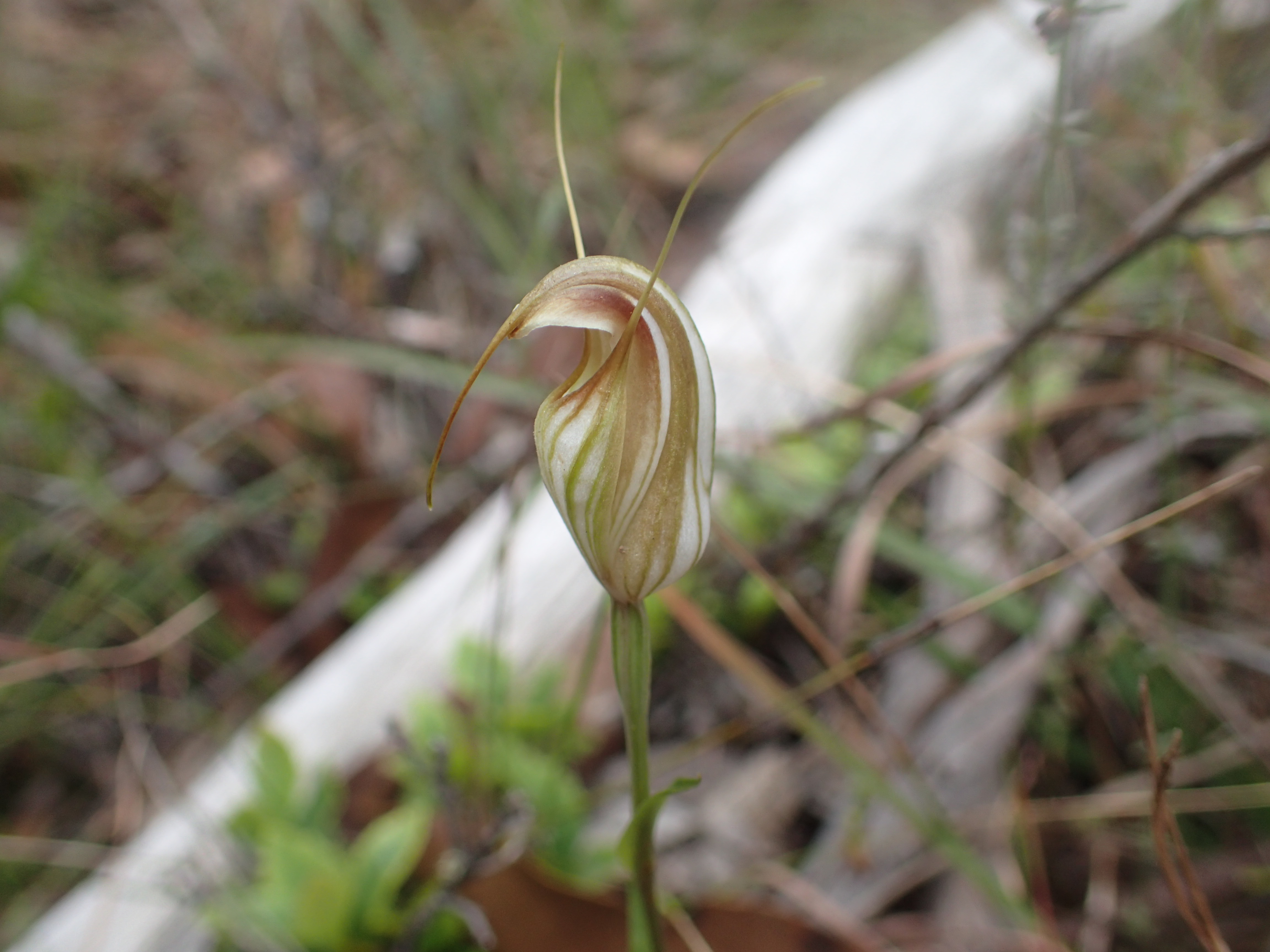
- Pterostylis aestiva growing in Cathedral Rock National Park

Scientific classification
- Kingdom: Plantae
- Clade: Tracheophytes
- Clade: Angiosperms
- Clade: Monocots
- Order: Asparagales
- Family: Orchidaceae
- Subfamily: Orchidoideae
- Tribe: Cranichideae
- Genus: Pterostylis
- Species: P. fischii

Binomial name
- Pterostylis fischii Nicholls

Synonyms
- Diplodium fischii (Nicholls) D.L.Jones & M.A.Clem.

= Pterostylis fischii =

Fisch's greenhood

Species of orchid

Pterostylis fischii, commonly known as Fisch's greenhood, is a species of orchid endemic to south-eastern Australia. As with similar greenhoods, the flowering plants differ from those which are not flowering. The non-flowering plants have a rosette of leaves flat on the ground but the flowering plants have a single flower with leaves on the flowering spike. This greenhood has tawny-coloured flowers, a dorsal sepal with a long thread-like tip and a labellum which is hidden inside the flower.

== Description ==
Pterostylis fischii is a terrestrial, perennial, deciduous, herb with an underground tuber and when not flowering, a rosette of egg-shaped leaves, each leaf 5–18 mm long and 6–12 mm wide. Flowering plants have a single flower 20–25 mm long and 7–9 mm wide borne on a flowering stem 150–250 mm high with between three and five stem leaves wrapped around the stem. The flowers are green, white and brown. The dorsal sepal and petals are fused, forming a hood or "galea" over the column. The dorsal sepal curves forward and downward with a thread-like tip 5–15 mm long. The lateral sepals are held closely against the galea, have an erect, thread-like tip 15–30 mm long and a broad V-shaped sinus between their bases. The labellum is 8–9 mm long, 3–4 mm wide, dark brown, blunt, and not visible in an intact flower. Flowering occurs from February to May.

== Taxonomy and naming ==
Pterostylis fischii was first formally described in 1950 by William Nicholls from a specimen collected near Woodside. The description was published in The Victorian Naturalist. The specific epithet (fischii) honours the Fisch family of Doncaster who discovered the species in 1949.

== Distribution and habitat ==
Fisch's greenhood grows among grasses and low shrubs in woodland and forest, mainly in the highlands of New South Wales south from the New England National Park, less commonly in eastern Victoria and southern Queensland.
