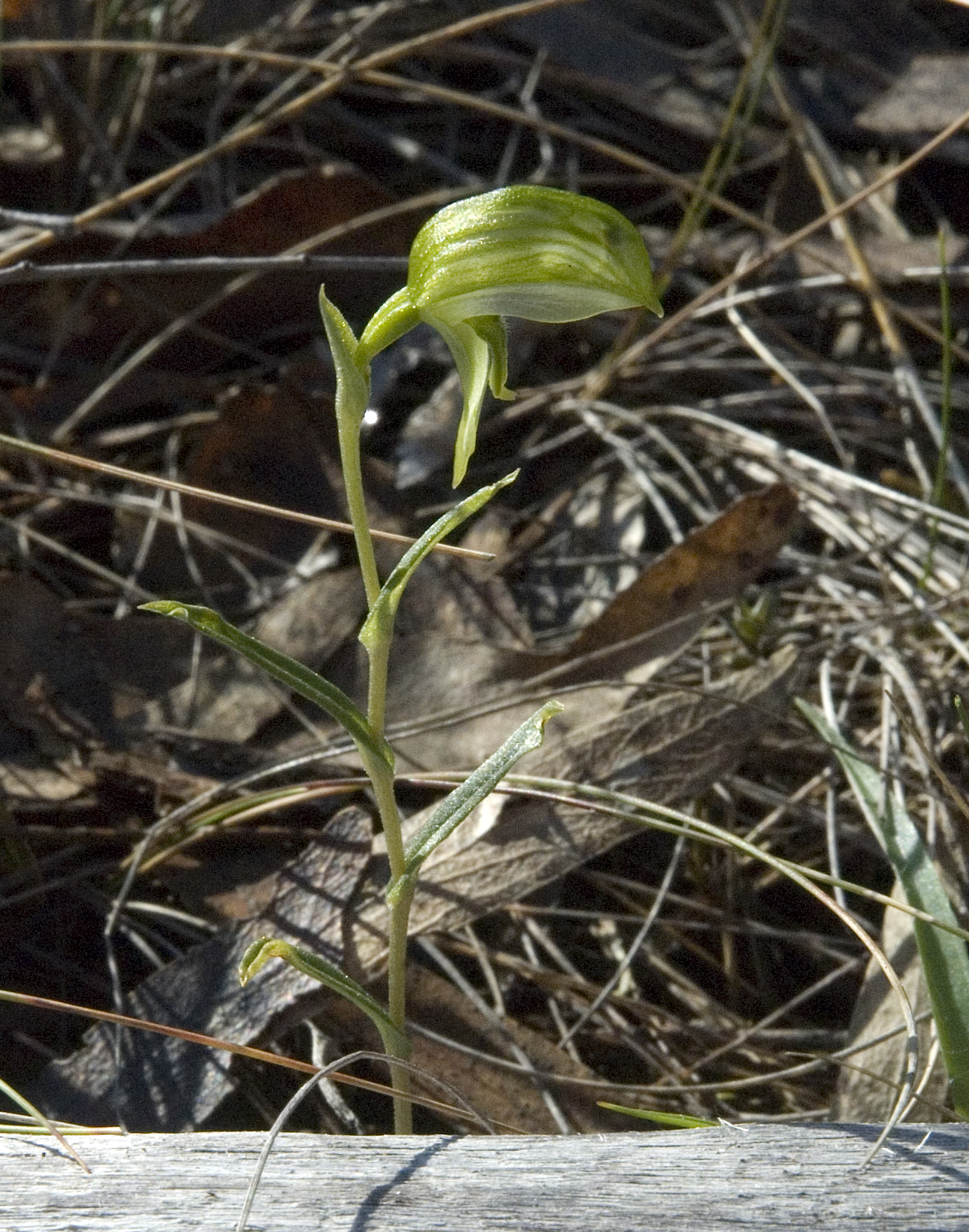

Scientific classification
- Kingdom: Plantae
- Clade: Tracheophytes
- Clade: Angiosperms
- Clade: Monocots
- Order: Asparagales
- Family: Orchidaceae
- Subfamily: Orchidoideae
- Tribe: Cranichideae
- Genus: Pterostylis
- Species: P. stenochila

Binomial name
- Pterostylis stenochila D.L.Jones

Synonyms
- Oligochaetochilus stenochilos (D.L.Jones) Szlach.; Bunochilus stenochilus (D.L.Jones) D.L.Jones & M.A.Clem.

= Pterostylis stenochila =

Narrow-lip leafy greenhood

Species of orchid

Pterostylis stenochila, commonly known as the narrow-lip leafy greenhood, is a plant in the orchid family Orchidaceae and is endemic to Tasmania. Flowering plants have up to seven shiny, transparent green flowers with darker green stripes. The flowers have an insect-like labellum which is green with an emerald green stripe along its centre. Non-flowering plants have a rosette of leaves on a stalk, but flowering plants lack the rosette, instead having five or six stem leaves.

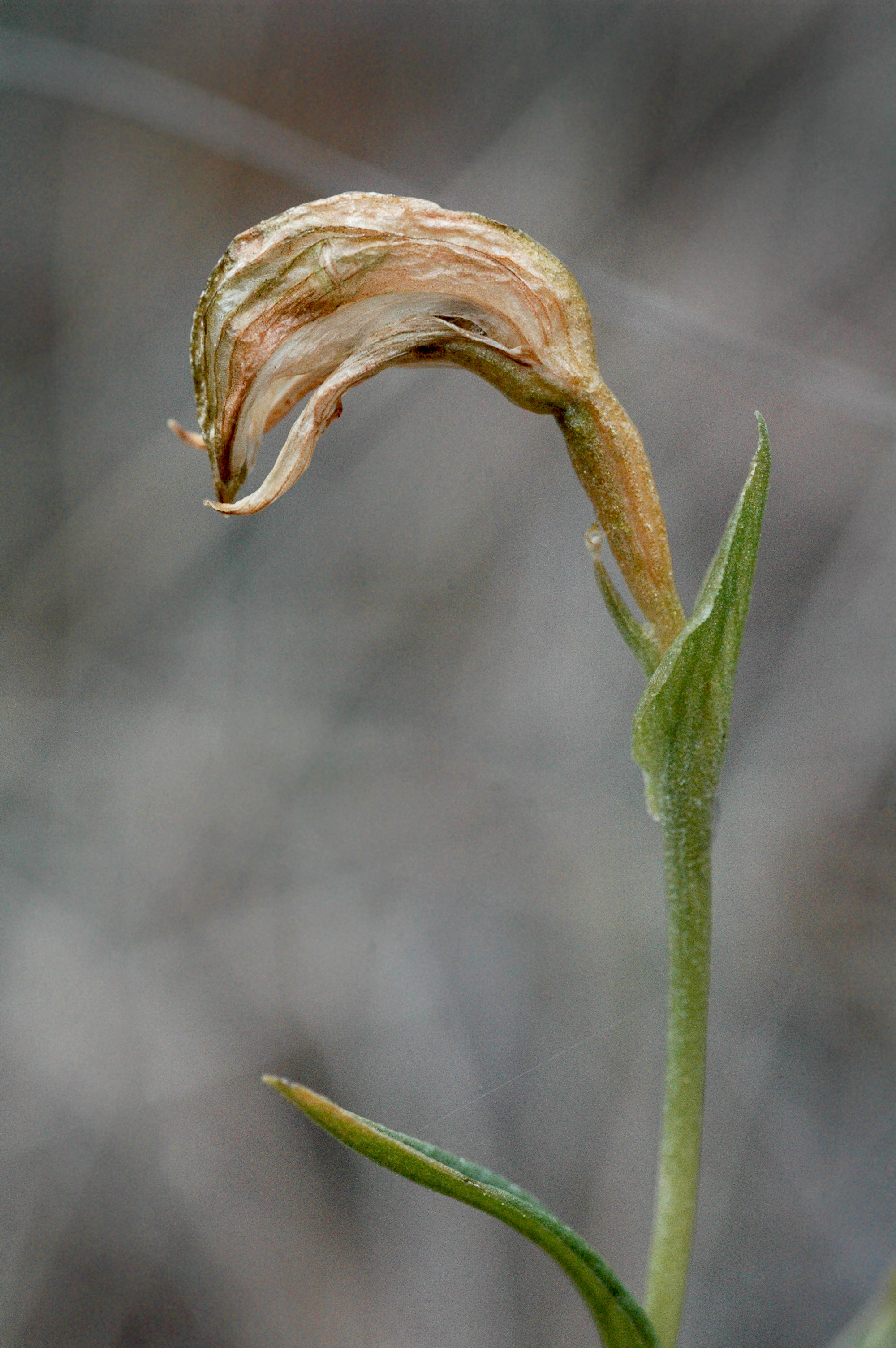
Pterostylis stenochila setting seeds

== Description ==
Pterostylis stenochila, is a terrestrial, perennial, deciduous, herb with an underground tuber. Non-flowering plants have a rosette of between three and five lance-shaped to egg-shaped leaves, each leaf 20–40 mm (0.8–2 in) long and 6–8 mm (0.2–0.3 in) wide on a stalk 30–50 mm (1–2 in) tall. Flowering plants have up to seven transparent green flowers with darker green stripes on a flowering spike 120–300 mm (5–10 in) high. The flowering spike has five or six lance-shaped to egg-shaped stem leaves which are 15–50 mm (0.6–2 in) long and 5–9 mm (0.2–0.4 in) wide. The dorsal sepal and petals are fused, forming a hood or "galea" over the column with the dorsal sepal having a short point on its tip. The petals have a wide, transparent flange on their outer edges. The lateral sepals turn downwards, 10–13 mm (0.4–0.5 in) long, about 5 mm (0.2 in) wide and joined for part of their length. The labellum is insect-like, 6–7 mm (0.2–0.3 in) long, about 2 mm (0.08 in) wide, with an emerald green stripe along it centre and a mound on the "head" end. Flowering occurs from July to September.

== Taxonomy and naming ==
Pterostylis stenochila was first formally described in 1998 by David Jones and the description was published in Muelleria from a specimen collected at Brooks Bay near Geeveston. The specific epithet (stenochila) is derived from the Ancient Greek words stenos meaning "narrow" and cheilos meaning "lip", referring to the narrow labellum.

== Distribution and habitat ==
The narrow-lip leafy greenhood grows in heathy forest at altitudes of up to 300 m (1,000 ft).
