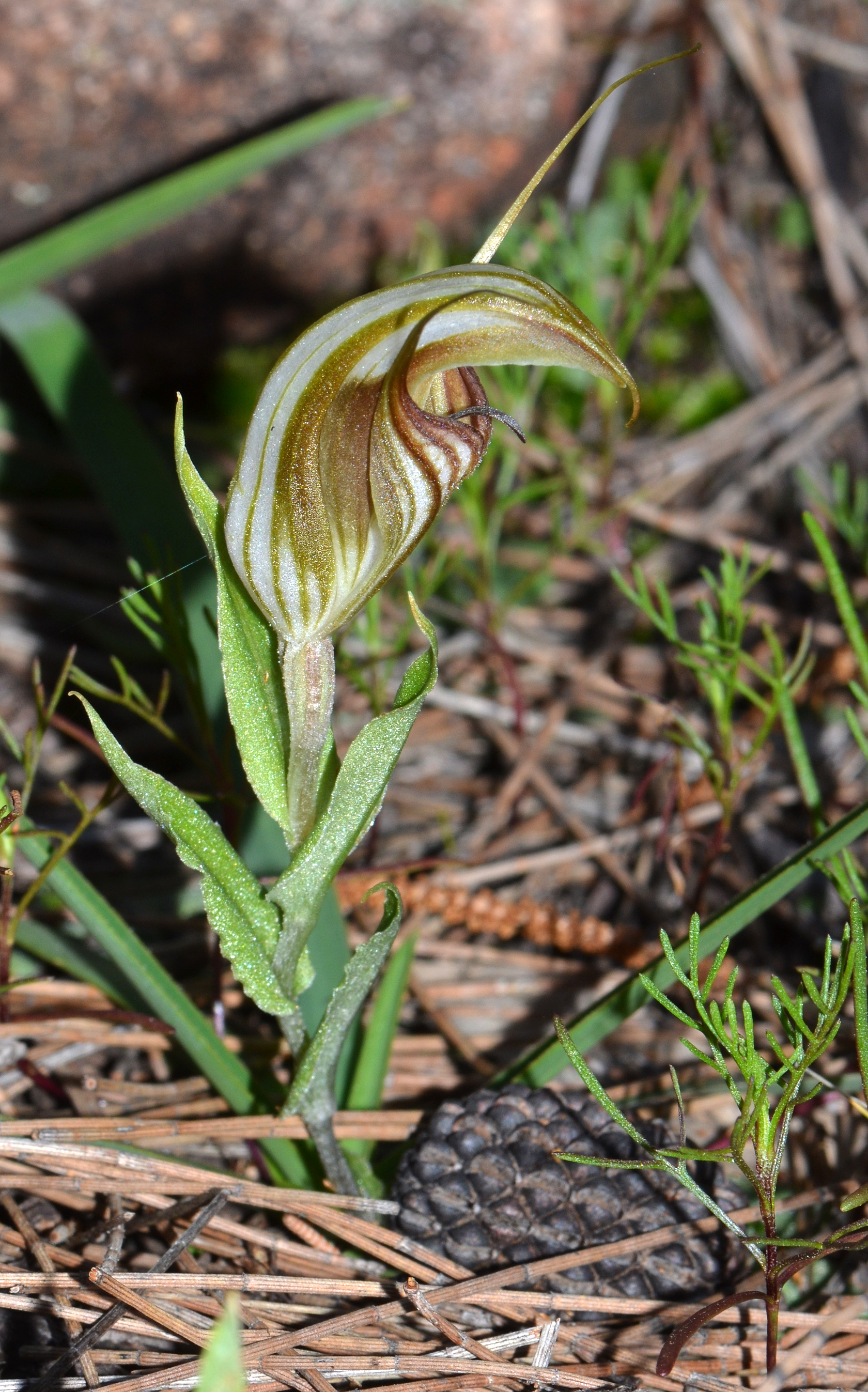
- Pterostylis hamiltonii

Scientific classification
- Kingdom: Plantae
- Clade: Tracheophytes
- Clade: Angiosperms
- Clade: Monocots
- Order: Asparagales
- Family: Orchidaceae
- Subfamily: Orchidoideae
- Tribe: Cranichideae
- Genus: Pterostylis
- Species: P. hamiltonii

Binomial name
- Pterostylis hamiltonii Nicholls

Synonyms
- Diplodium hamiltonii (R.Br.) D.L.Jones & M.A.Clem.

= Pterostylis hamiltonii =

Red-veined shell orchid

Species of orchid

Pterostylis hamiltonii, commonly known as the red-veined shell orchid, is a species of orchid endemic to the south-west of Western Australia. As with similar orchids, the flowering plants differ from those which are not flowering. The non-flowering plants have a rosette of leaves but the flowering plants lack a rosette and have a single flower with leaves on the flowering spike. This greenhood has a green and white, striped flower with reddish-brown markings and forms colonies, sometimes of thousands of plants.

== Description ==
Pterostylis hamiltonii is a terrestrial, perennial, deciduous, herb with an underground tuber and when not flowering, a rosette of bluish-green leaves, each leaf 5–14 mm long and 5–12 mm wide. Flowering plants usually have a single flower 25–30 mm long and 12–15 mm wide borne on a spike 50–150 mm high with four to six stem leaves 20–40 mm long and 2–8 mm wide. The flowers are white with green or reddish-brown stripes and markings. The dorsal sepal and petals are fused, forming a hood or "galea" over the column. The dorsal sepal curves forward with a thread-like tip 1–3 mm long. The lateral sepals are erect and held closely against the galea. They have thread-like ends 20-25 long and between their bases there is a broad, flat sinus with a central notch. The labellum is 15–20 mm long, about 3 mm wide, dark red and curved and protrudes above the sinus. Flowering occurs from late May to early August.

== Taxonomy and naming ==
Pterostylis hamiltonii was first formally described in 1810 by William Henry Nicholls and the description was published in The Victorian Naturalist from a specimen collected near Boyup Brook. The specific epithet (hamiltonii) honours Alex. G. Hamilton, (1852-1941) "a veteran in the field of botanical research".

== Distribution and habitat ==
The red-veined shell orchid is found between Toodyay and the Stirling Range where it usually grows in thickets of Allocasuarina huegeliana on or near granite outcrops in the Avon Wheatbelt, Esperance Plains, Jarrah Forest and Swan Coastal Plain biogeographic regions.

== Conservation ==
Pterostylis grandiflora is classified as "not threatened" by the Western Australian Government Department of Parks and Wildlife.
