= William Henry Nicholls =

Australian botanist (1885-1951)

- Born: 23 July 1885; Ballarat, Australia
- Died: 10 March 1951 (aged 65); Footscray, Australia
- Citizenship: Australian
- Scientific career
- Fields: Botany
- Author abbrev. (botany): Nicholls

William Henry Nicholls (23 July 1885 – 10 March 1951) was an Australian amateur botanist, authority on, and collector of Australian orchids. An accomplished photographer and watercolourist, he contributed almost 100 articles on orchids to The Victorian Naturalist, many of which described new species with line drawings. He was working on producing a 24-volume illustrated monograph of all the orchids of Australia when he died. Only four volumes were published shortly after his death but the entire work was published in a single book, Orchids of Australia in 1969. Some of the many orchids described and named by Nicholls and retaining the name he gave them include Caladenia caudata, Caladenia echidnachila, Caladenia ensata, Caladenia ferruginea, Caladenia magniclavata, Caladenia ornata, Caladenia praecox, Caladenia radiata, Pterostylis fischii, Pterostylis hamiltonii, Pterostylis hildae and Pterostylis tenuissima. The orchid Prasophyllum nichollsianum (now generally recognised in Australia as Genoplesium nudiscapum) was named in his honour by Herman Rupp.
