= The Victorian Naturalist =

Scientific journal published in Victoria, Australia

- Discipline: Natural history
- Language: English

Publication details
- History: 1884–present
- Publisher: Field Naturalists Club of Victoria (Australia)
- Frequency: Bimonthly

Standard abbreviations
- ISO 4: Vic. Nat.

Indexing
- CODEN: VICNAW
- ISSN: 0042-5184
- LCCN: sf81002054
- OCLC no.: 502280346

Links
- Journal homepage

The Victorian Naturalist is a bimonthly scientific journal covering natural history, especially of Australia. It is published by the Field Naturalists Club of Victoria and is received as part of the membership subscription of that club. From 1881, club proceedings and papers had been published in the Southern Science Record and Magazine of Natural History before the first issue of The Victorian Naturalist appeared in January 1884. The journal publishes peer-reviewed research articles, research reports, "Naturalist Notes", and book reviews. The journal was published monthly until 1976, since then it has been published bimonthly. In that period several special issues have been published. These covered particular natural history topics or significant centenaries: of the club (1980), the death of Ferdinand von Mueller (1996), and the establishment of Wilsons Promontory National Park and Mount Buffalo National Park (1998). In 2001 there was a special issue on Frederick McCoy, the first president of the club. The journal was abstracted and indexed by Scopus in 1980 and 1984 and from 2008 to 2014.
