= Dariusz Szlachetko =

Polish botanist

- Born: 1961
- Known for: Work on orchids
- Scientific career
- Fields: Botany, Orchidology

Dariusz Lucjan Szlachetko (born 1961) is a Polish botanist and orchidologist.

== Publications ==
- Garaya D.L. Szlachetko in Polish Bot. Stud., 5: 4 (1993). Schiedeella schlechteriana D.L. Szlachetko & C.J. Sheviak in Rhodora, 92(869): 11 (1990).
- "Systema orchidalium". In: Fragmenta Floristica et Geobotanica Polonica 3:1–152 (1995).
