= Enamel orchid =

Enamel orchid is a common name for several plants and may refer to:

- Caladenia brunonis, the purple enamel orchid
- Caladenia emarginata, the pink enamel orchid
- Elythranthera, commonly known as enamel orchids, a defunct genus, to which the above were formerly allocated
