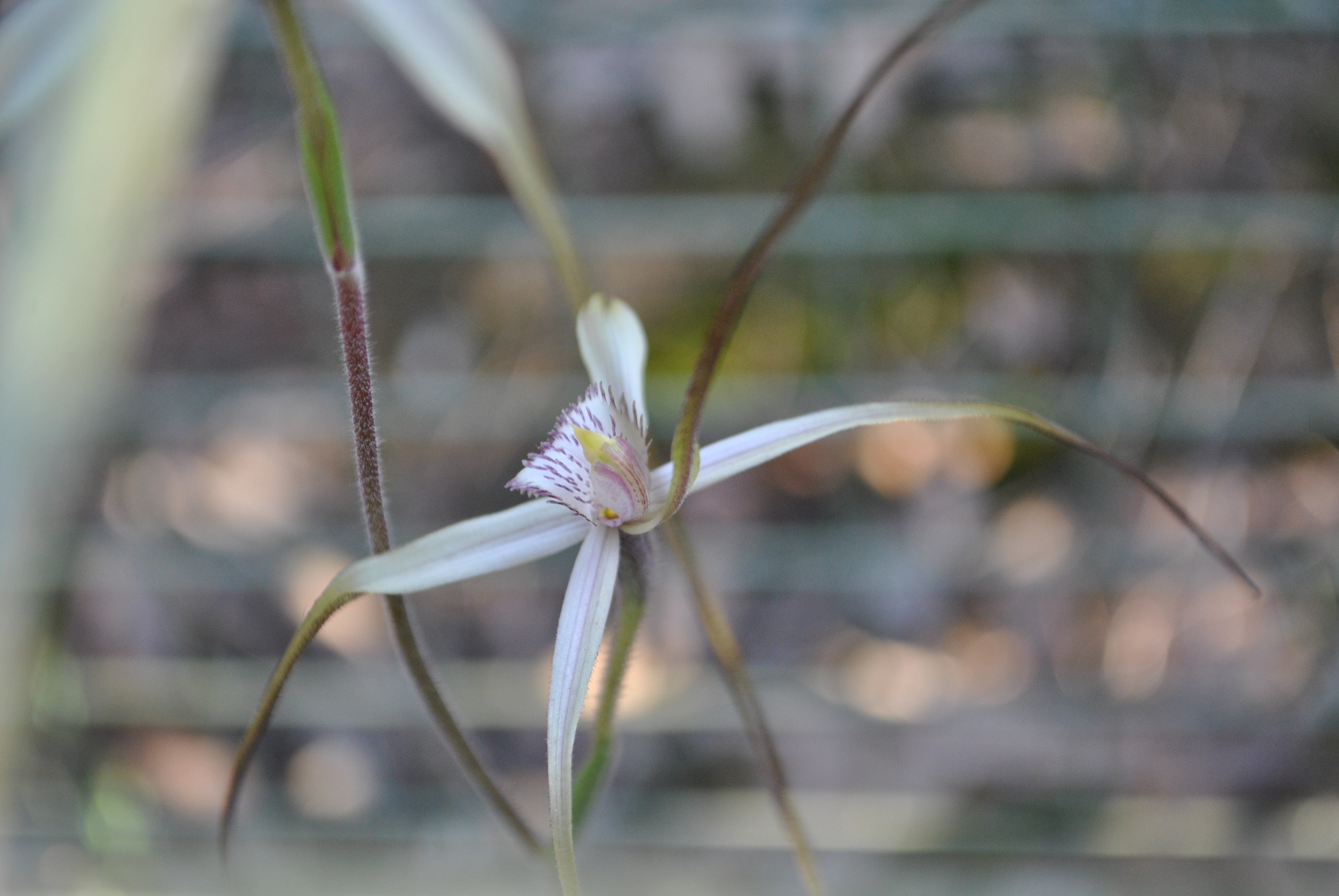
- Flower of the Kilsyth South spider-orchid

Conservation status
- Critically endangered (EPBC Act)

Scientific classification
- Kingdom: Plantae
- Clade: Tracheophytes
- Clade: Angiosperms
- Clade: Monocots
- Order: Asparagales
- Family: Orchidaceae
- Subfamily: Orchidoideae
- Tribe: Diurideae
- Subtribe: Caladeniinae
- Genus: Caladenia
- Species: C. sp. Kilsyth South

Binomial name
- Caladenia sp. Kilsyth South

Synonyms
- Caladenia sp. aff. venusta (Kilsyth South); Arachnorchis sp. aff. venusta (Kilsyth South)

= Caladenia sp. Kilsyth South =

Kilsyth South spider-orchid

Species of orchid

Caladenia sp. Kilsyth South, also known as the Kilsyth South spider-orchid, is an extremely rare ground orchid endemic to Kilsyth South, a suburb of Melbourne, Victoria, Australia. The flower was discovered in 1991 and described by the local ecologist Dr. Graeme Lorimer. The plant is described as "a terrestrial orchid growing to 35 cm tall, with one to two large creamy white flowers". The tepals grow to 70 mm long, giving it its spider-like appearance, and have reddish-brown glandular tips. The labellum (lip) of the flower has reddish calli and teeth. Only 23 plants were ever observed, while the population has currently decreased to only one adult flowering plant. Royal Botanic Gardens Victoria has undertaken symbiotic germination of the orchid's seeds for conservation purposes in its laboratories.

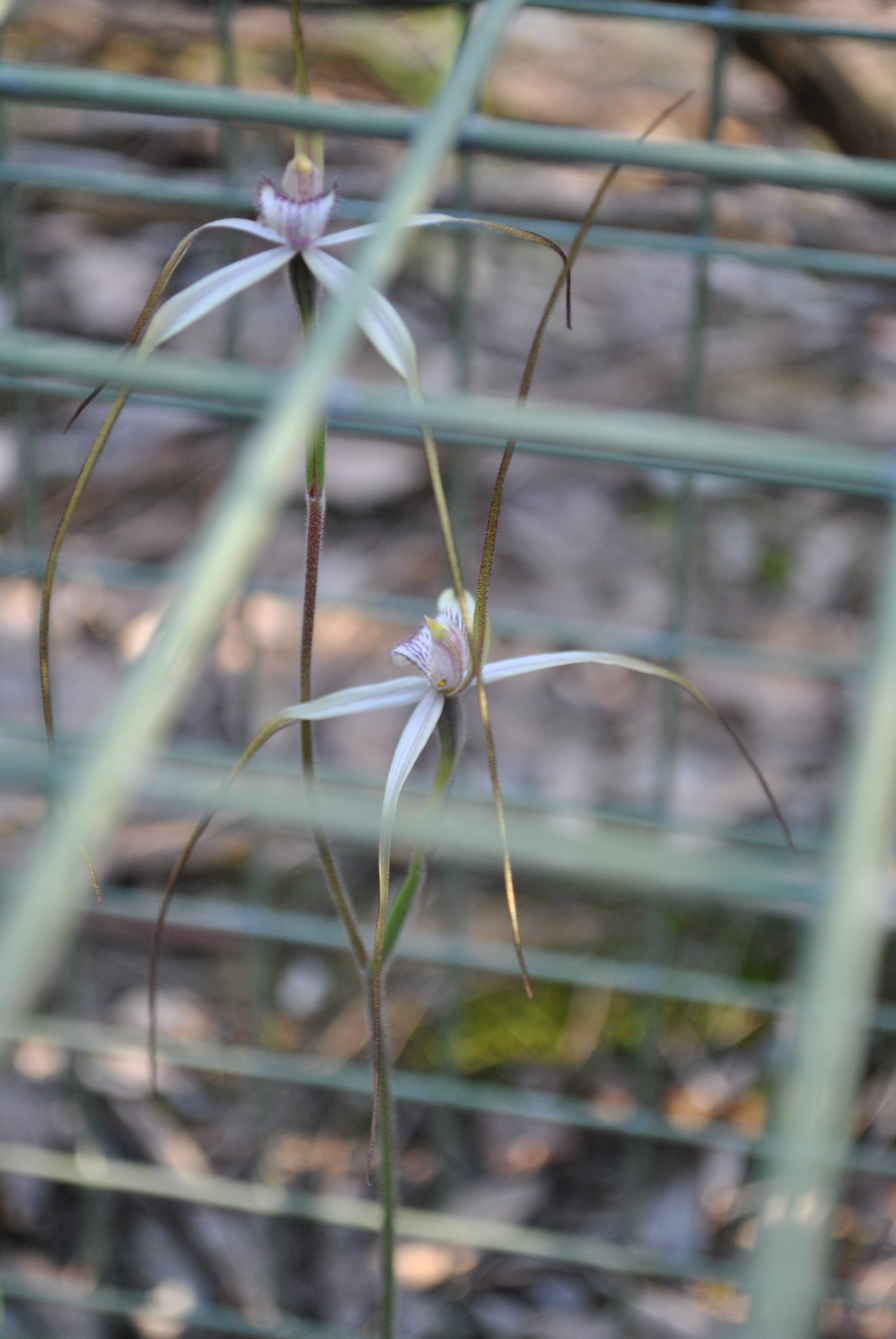
Kilsyth South spider-orchid

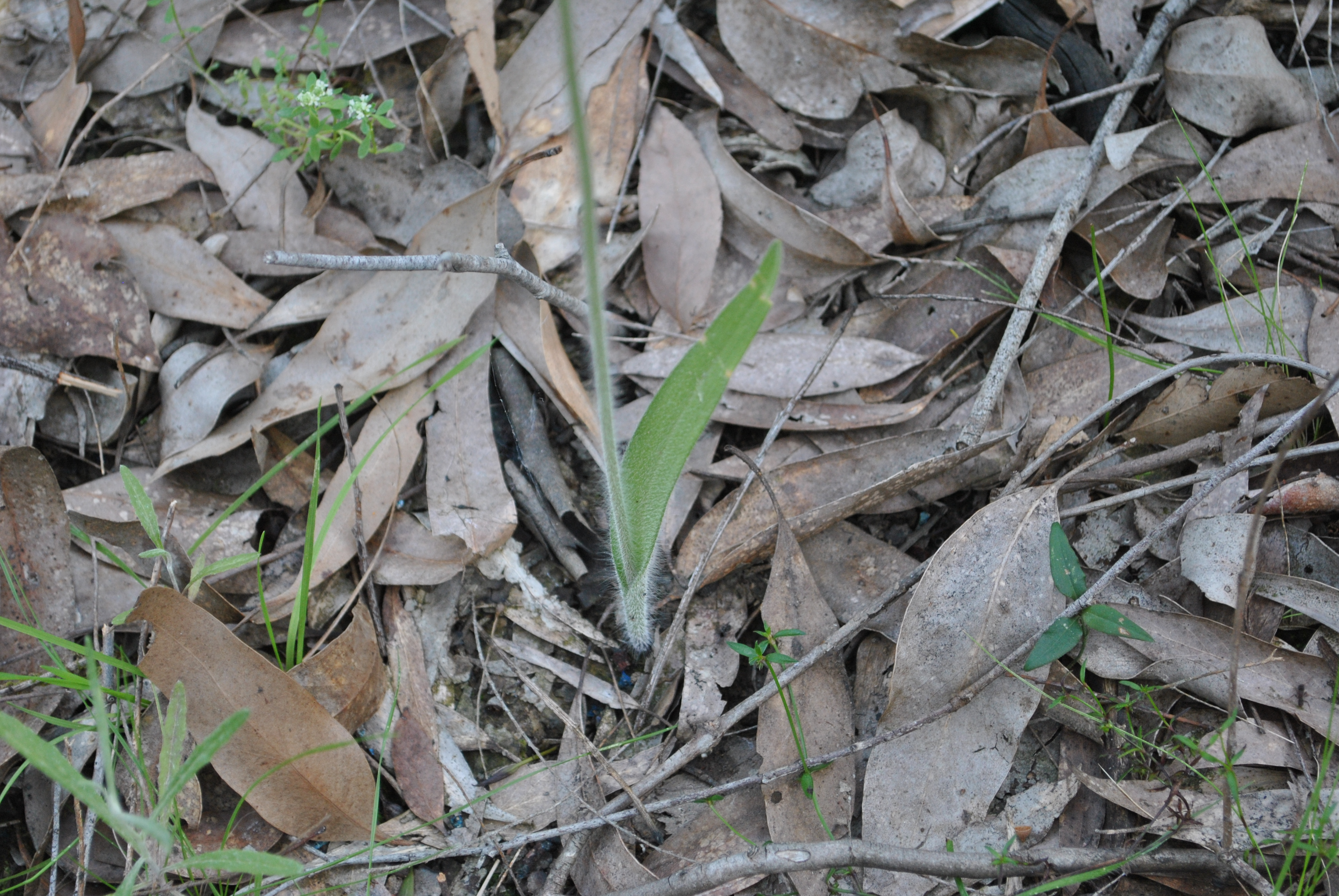
Leaf and stem of the orchid
