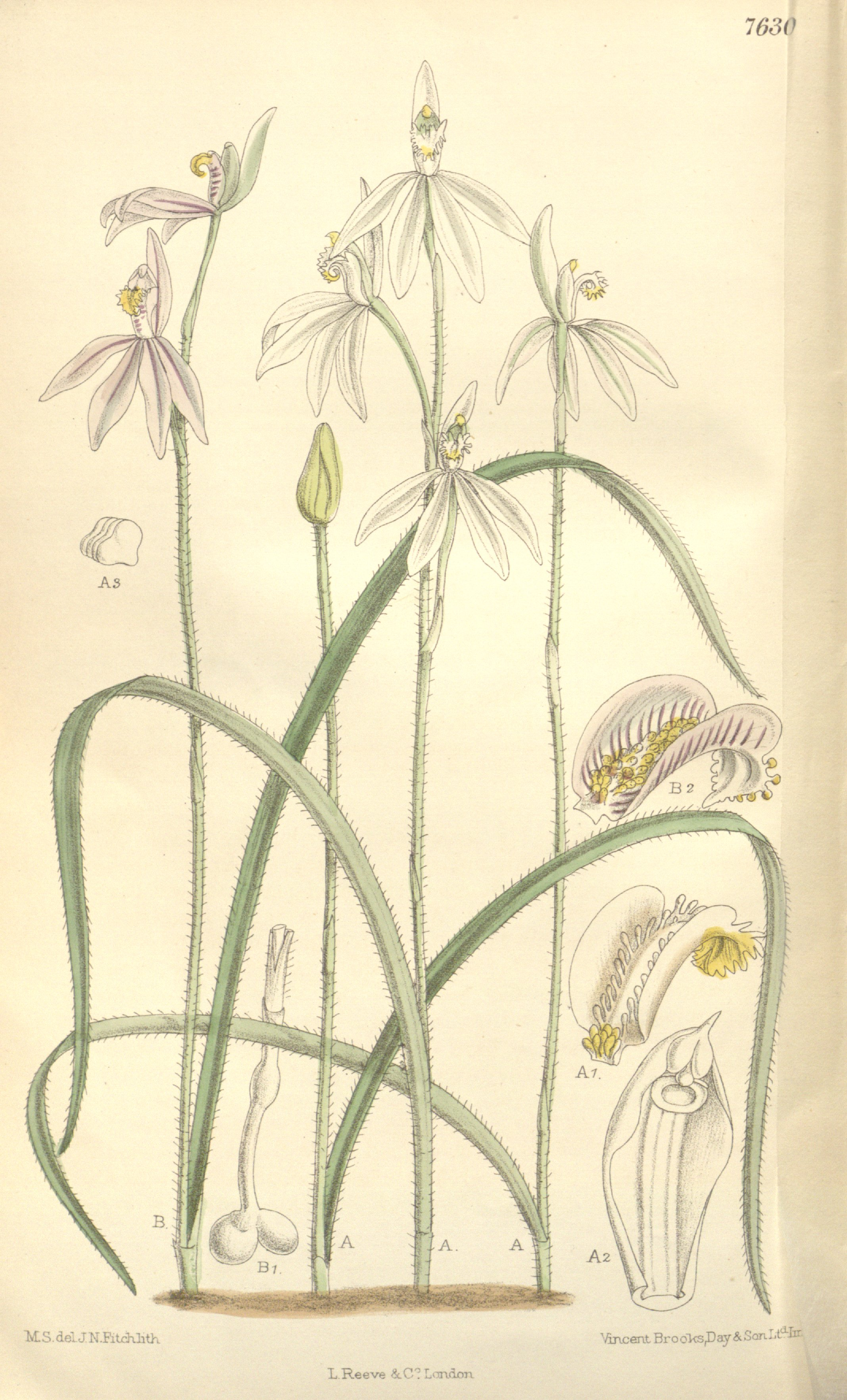
- Illustration of Caladenia carnea

Scientific classification
- Kingdom: Plantae
- Clade: Tracheophytes
- Clade: Angiosperms
- Clade: Monocots
- Order: Asparagales
- Family: Orchidaceae
- Subfamily: Orchidoideae
- Tribe: Diurideae
- Subtribe: Caladeniinae; Pfitzer, Entw. Nat. Anord. Orch.: 97 (1887)

Genera
- Adenochilus; Aporostylis; Caladenia; Cyanicula; Elythranthera; Ericksonella; Eriochilus; Glossodia; Leptoceras; Pheladenia; Praecoxanthus

= Caladeniinae =

Subtribe of orchids

Caladeniinae is an orchid subtribe in the tribe Diurideae.

== See also ==
- Taxonomy of the Orchidaceae
