= Stigmatodactylus elegans =

Scientific classification
- Kingdom: Plantae
- Clade: Tracheophytes
- Clade: Angiosperms
- Clade: Monocots
- Order: Asparagales
- Family: Orchidaceae
- Subfamily: Orchidoideae
- Tribe: Diurideae
- Genus: Stigmatodactylus
- Species: S. elegans

Binomial name
- Stigmatodactylus elegans Rchb.f., 1876

Synonyms
- Acianthella elegans (Rchb.f.) D.L.Jones & M.A.Clem., 2004; Acianthopsis elegans (Rchb.f.) Szlach., 2001; Acianthus tenellus Schltr., 1906; Aeranthes elegans (Rchb.f.) Kraenzl., 1928; Univiscidiatus elegans (Rchb.f.) Szlach., 2001

Species of flowering plant

Stigmatodactylus elegans, commonly known as the elegant acianthus, is a species of mosquito orchid, plants in the genus Stigmatodactylus. It is found in New Caledonia.
