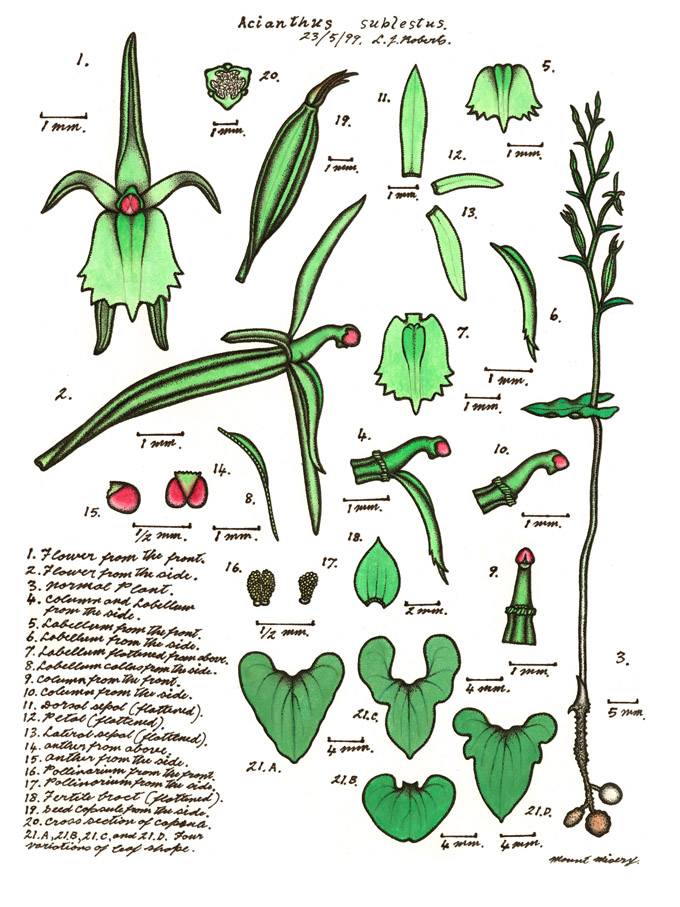
- Illustration by Lewis Roberts

Scientific classification
- Kingdom: Plantae
- Clade: Tracheophytes
- Clade: Angiosperms
- Clade: Monocots
- Order: Asparagales
- Family: Orchidaceae
- Subfamily: Orchidoideae
- Tribe: Diurideae
- Genus: Stigmatodactylus
- Species: S. amplexicaulis

Binomial name
- Stigmatodactylus amplexicaulis (F.M.Bailey) Rolfe

Synonyms
- List: Acianthella amplexicaulis (F.M.Bailey) D.L.Jones & M.A.Clem.; Acianthopsis amplexicaulis (F.M.Bailey) Szlach.; Acianthus amplexicaulis (F.M.Bailey) Rolfe; Listera amplexicaulis (F.M.Bailey) F.M.Bailey; Microstylis amplexicaulis F.M.Bailey; Univiscidiatus amplexicaulis (F.M.Bailey) Szlach.

= Stigmatodactylus amplexicaulis =

Species of flowering plant

Stigmatodactylus amplexicaulis, is a species of flowering plant in the orchid family Orchidaceae and is native to eastern Australia and New Caledonia. It is a terrestrial herb with a single leaf and between 2 and 20 translucent green flowers.

== Description ==
Stigmatodactylus amplexicaulis is a terrestrial herb with a single leaf 20–25 mm (0.79–0.98 in) long and 15–25 mm (0.59–0.98 in) wide, usually with deep lobes on the edges. Between 2 and 20 translucent green flowers are borne on a raceme 50–90 mm (2.0–3.5 in) long. The dorsal sepal is linear, about 3 mm (0.12 in) long and 0.5 mm (0.020 in), and the lateral sepals are linear, spread apart from each other, curved downwards, about 3 mm (0.12 in) long and 0.5 mm (0.020 in) wide. The petals are spread apart or turned down, about 2 mm (0.079 in) long and 0.5 mm (0.020 in) wide. The labellum is broadly oblong, about 2.5 mm (0.098 in) wide and 2 mm (0.079 in) wide with coarse teeth near the end. There is a fleshy green callus near the base of the labellum and the pollinium is burgundy-coloured.

== Taxonomy ==
The species was first described in 1891 by Frederick Manson Bailey who gave it the name Microstylis amplexicaulis in the "Botany Bulletin" of the "Department of Agriculture, Queensland" from specimens collected in the "scrubs of Eudlo Creek in 1891". In 1903, Robert Allen Rolfe transferred the species to Acianthus as A. amplexicaulis in The Orchid Review, a name accepted by Plants of the World Online and in New Caledonia. In 2004, David Jones and Mark Clements transferred the species from M. amplexicaulis to Acianthella as A. amplexicaulis in The Orchadian, and the name is accepted by National Herbarium of New South Wales. In 2017, Stephanie Pimm Lyon, Mark Clements and David Jones transferred the species to the genus Stigmatodactylus as S. amplexicaulis, a name accepted by the Australian Plant Census.

The specific epithet (amplexicaulis) means "stem-clasping".

== Distribution ==
Stigmatodactylus amplexicaulis grows in moist coastal scrub in littoral rainforest from north-eastern Queensland to Wyrrabalong National Park in New South Wales, and in New Caledonia.
