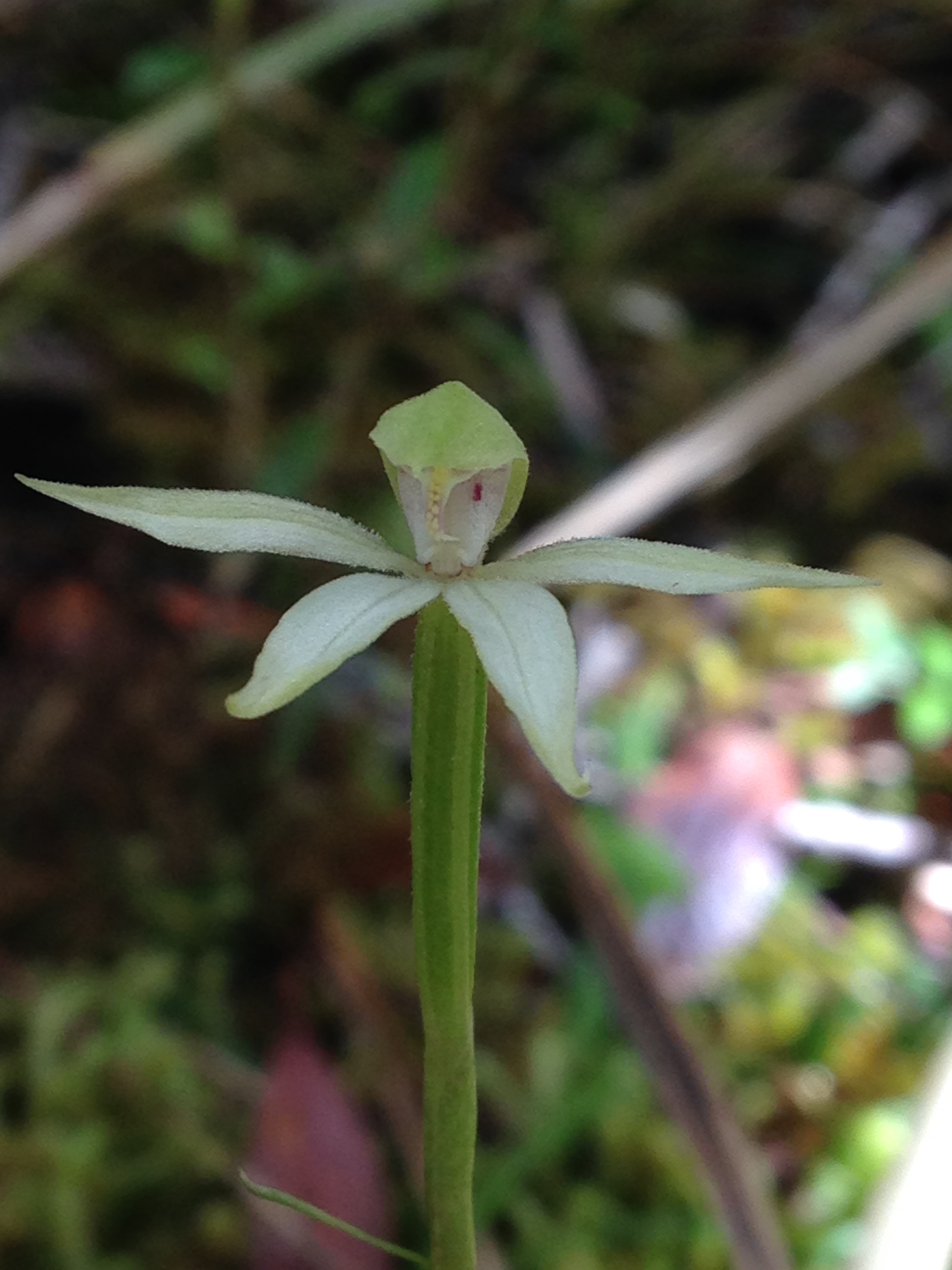
- Adenochilus gracilis in Kahurangi National Park

Scientific classification
- Kingdom: Plantae
- Clade: Tracheophytes
- Clade: Angiosperms
- Clade: Monocots
- Order: Asparagales
- Family: Orchidaceae
- Subfamily: Orchidoideae
- Tribe: Diurideae
- Genus: Adenochilus
- Species: A. gracilis

Binomial name
- Adenochilus gracilis Hook.f.

= Adenochilus gracilis =

Species of flowering plant

Adenochilus gracilis is a species of plant in the orchid family Orchidaceae and is endemic to New Zealand. It has a long, thin underground rhizome, a single leaf on the flowering stem and a single white flower with glandular hairs on the outside. Its labellum has red to maroon bars and a central band of yellow calli, but is almost obscured by the dorsal sepal.

== Description ==
Adenochilus gracilis is a terrestrial, perennial, deciduous, herb with a long, thin, horizontal rhizome. There is a single egg-shaped to oblong leaf with a heart-shaped base, 10–30 mm (0.4–1 in) long, near the base of the flowering stem. There is a similar leaf about halfway up the flowering stem, but lacking a petiole. A single white flower 10–20 mm (0.4–0.8 in) wide is borne on the end of the flowering spike which is up to 200 mm (8 in) tall. The outer surface of the sepals and petals is covered with short glandular hairs. The dorsal sepal is lance-shaped and forms a hood over the labellum and column, almost obscuring them. The lateral sepals spread widely apart from each other, and the petals are similar to the sepals. The labellum curves downwards and has three lobes, the central lobe narrower than the others, and has red to maroon bars and two to four rows of yellow calli in a dense central band. Flowering occurs between October and March.

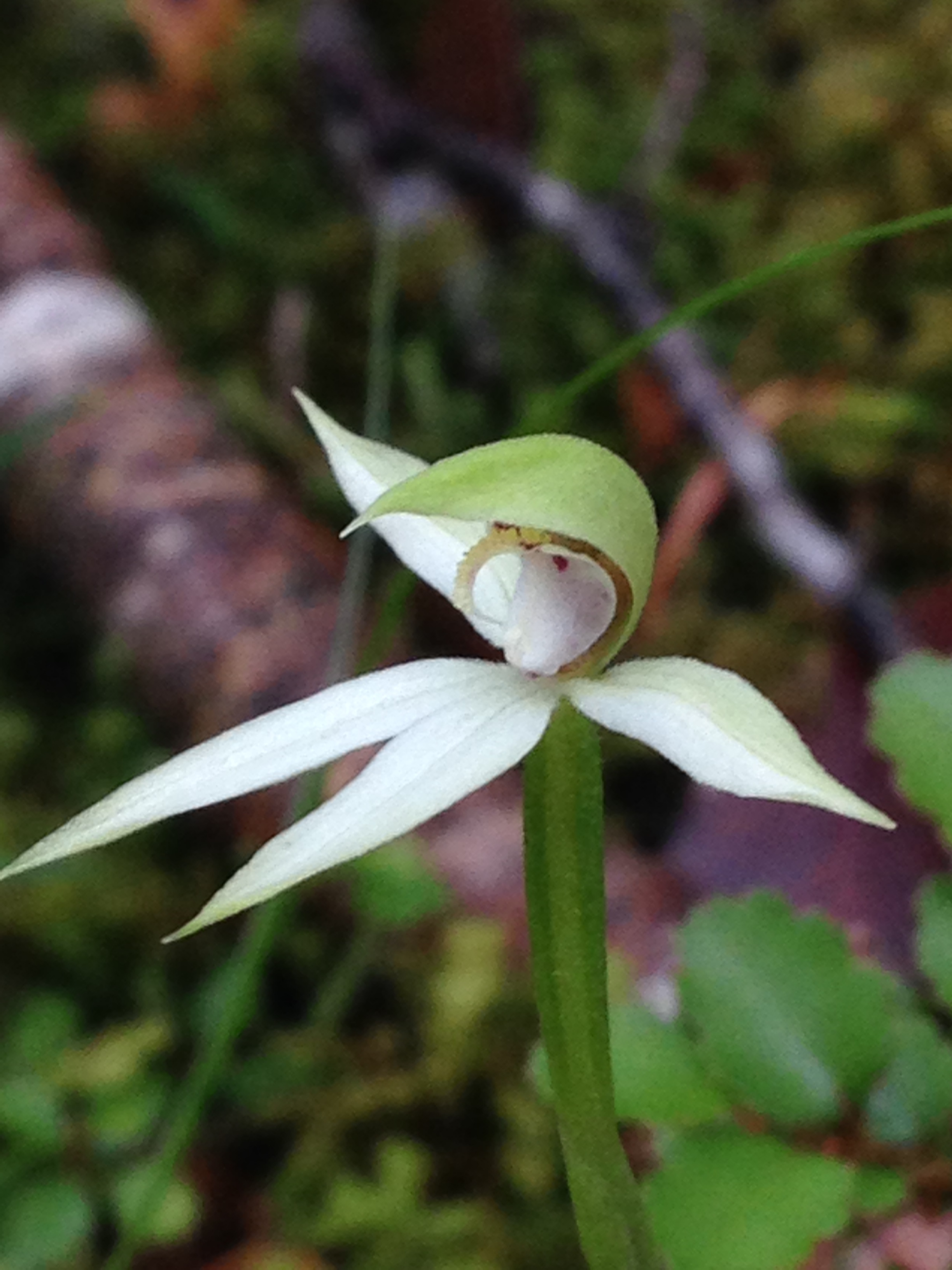
A side view, showing the green "hood."

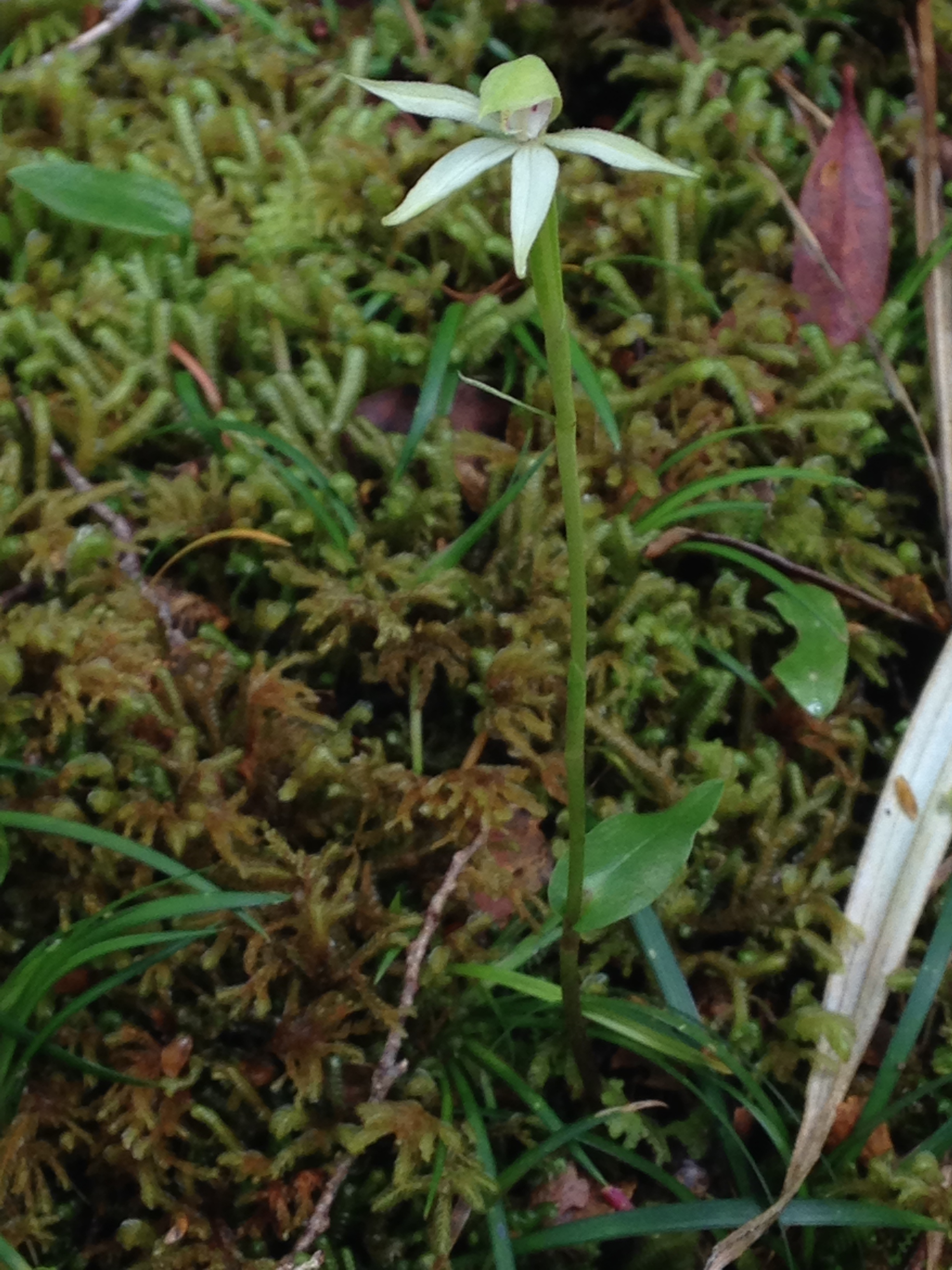
The growth habit, with its singular, stem, leaf, and flower.

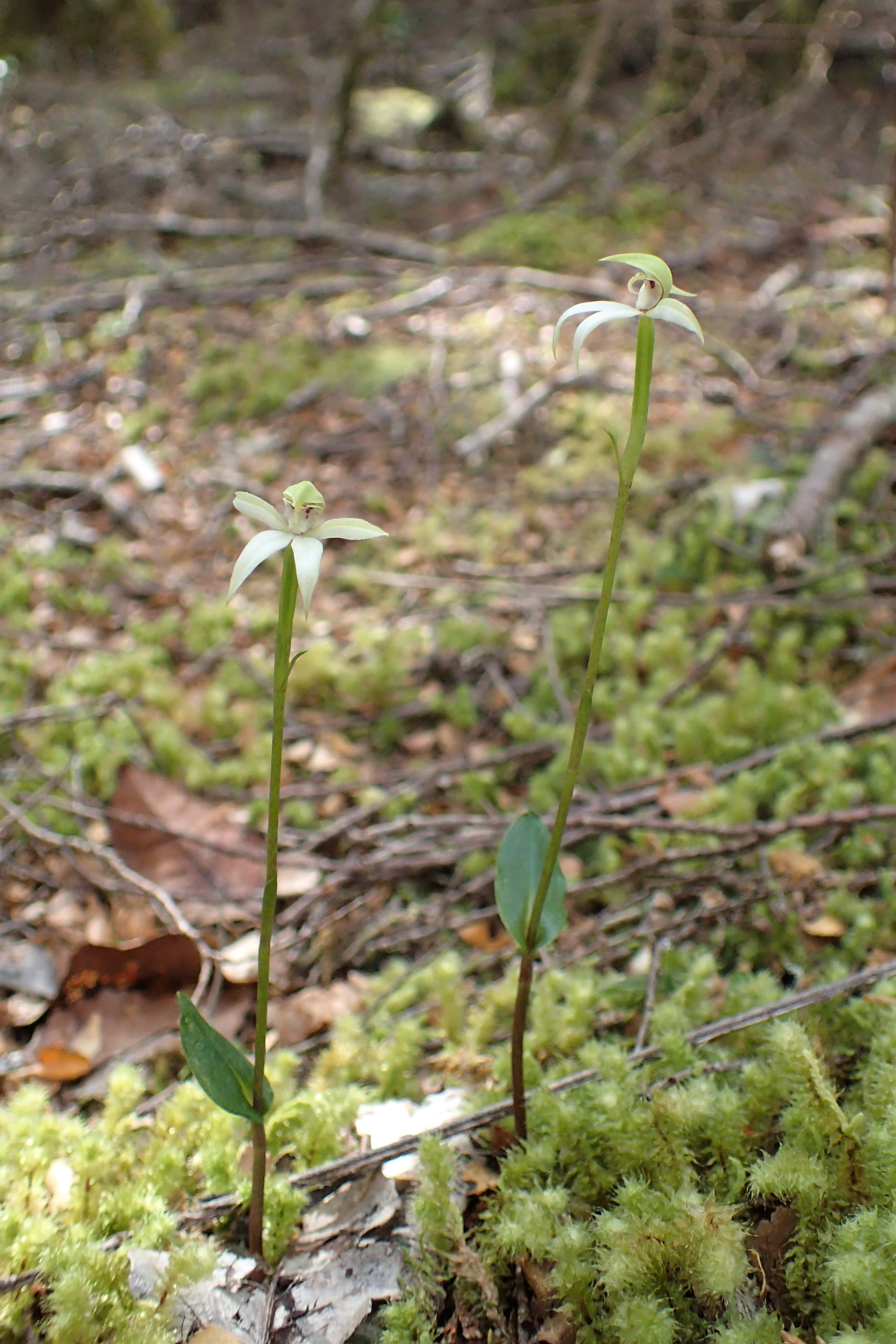
Two plants growing together near Makarora in Otago.

== Taxonomy and naming ==
Adenochilus gracilis was first formally described in 1853 by Joseph Dalton Hooker and the description was published in Flora Novae-Zelandiae. The specific epithet (gracilis) is a Latin word meaning "slender.

== Distribution and habitat ==
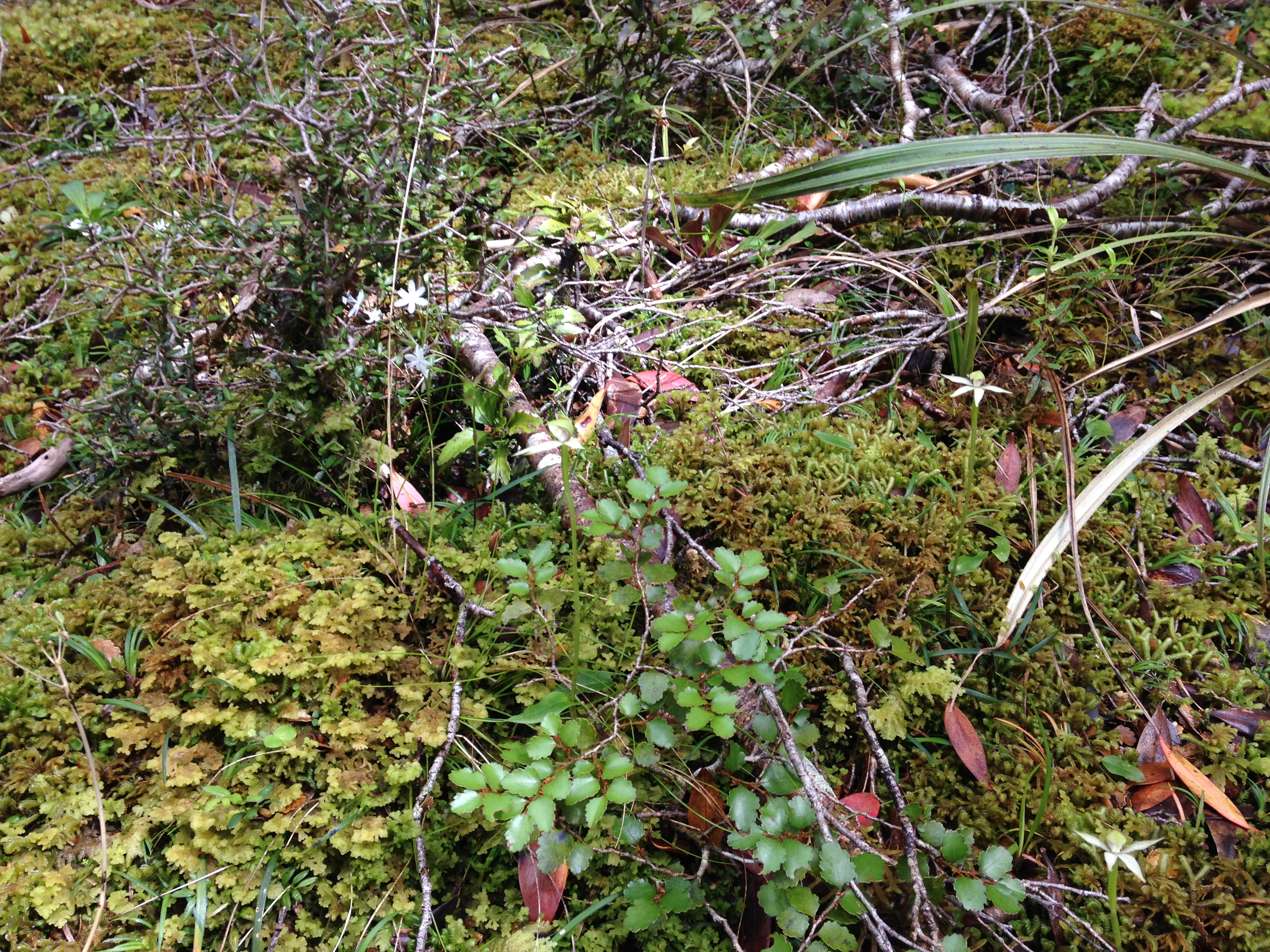
Habitat amongst dense layers of moss.

This orchid grows in thick layers of moss or partly decomposed leaf litter in scrub and forests. It is found on the North, South, Stewart and Chatham Islands.
