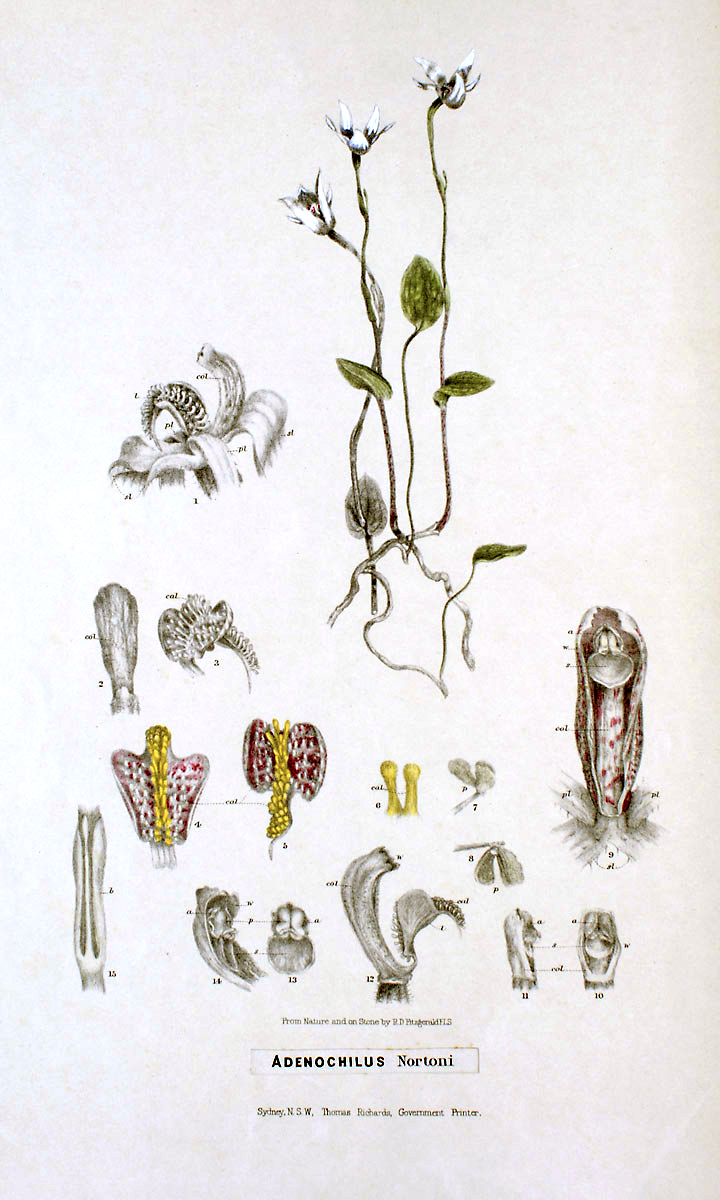
- Illustration of Adenochilus nortonii

Scientific classification
- Kingdom: Plantae
- Clade: Tracheophytes
- Clade: Angiosperms
- Clade: Monocots
- Order: Asparagales
- Family: Orchidaceae
- Subfamily: Orchidoideae
- Tribe: Diurideae
- Genus: Adenochilus
- Species: A. nortonii

Binomial name
- Adenochilus nortonii Fitzg.

Synonyms
- Adenochilus nortoni Fitzg. orth. var.; Caladenia nortoni F.Muell. orth. var.; Caladenia nortonii (Fitzg.) F.Muell.

= Adenochilus nortonii =

White gnome orchid

Species of flowering plant

Adenochilus nortonii, commonly known as the white gnome orchid or Australian gnome orchid, is a plant in the orchid family Orchidaceae and is endemic to a few isolated locations in New South Wales. It has a long, thin underground rhizome, a single leaf and a single white flower with reddish glandular hairs on the outside. Its labellum has red bars and a central band of yellow calli.

== Description ==
Adenochilus nortonii is a terrestrial, perennial, deciduous, herb with a long, thin, horizontal rhizome and a single egg-shaped to lance-shaped leaf, 15–35 mm (0.6–1 in) long and 10–16 mm (0.4–0.6 in) wide with reddish spots on the lower surface. A single white flower 15–20 mm (0.6–0.8 in) long and 20–30 mm (0.8–1 in) wide is borne on the end of a flowering spike 60–120 mm (2–5 in) tall. The outer surface of the sepals and petals is covered with reddish glandular hairs. The dorsal sepal is broad elliptic in shape, 12–16 mm (0.5–0.6 in) long, 7–8 mm (0.28–0.31 in) wide and forms a hood over the labellum and column. The lateral sepals are 13–16 mm (0.5–0.6 in) long, 4–5 mm (0.16–0.20 in) wide and spread widely apart from each other. The petals are 10–14 mm (0.4–0.6 in) long, about 3 mm (0.1 in) wide and slightly erect. The labellum is strongly curved when viewed from the side, about 5 mm (0.2 in) long and 4–5 mm (0.16–0.20 in) wide, with three lobes with red bars. The middle lobe is narrow with a dense central band of yellow calli and the side lobes are broader. Flowering occurs in November and December.

== Taxonomy and naming ==
Adenochilus nortonii was first formally described in 1876 by Robert FitzGerald from a specimen collected near Mount Victoria and the description was published in his book Australian Orchids. The specific epithet (nortonii) honours James Norton (1824-1906), an amateur botanist and friend of Fitzgerald.

== Distribution and habitat ==
The white gnome orchid grows in rock crevices, in sphagnum and near creeks in beech forest, usually above 900 m (3,000 ft). It is found in the Blue Mountains, Barrington Tops and Point Lookout areas.
