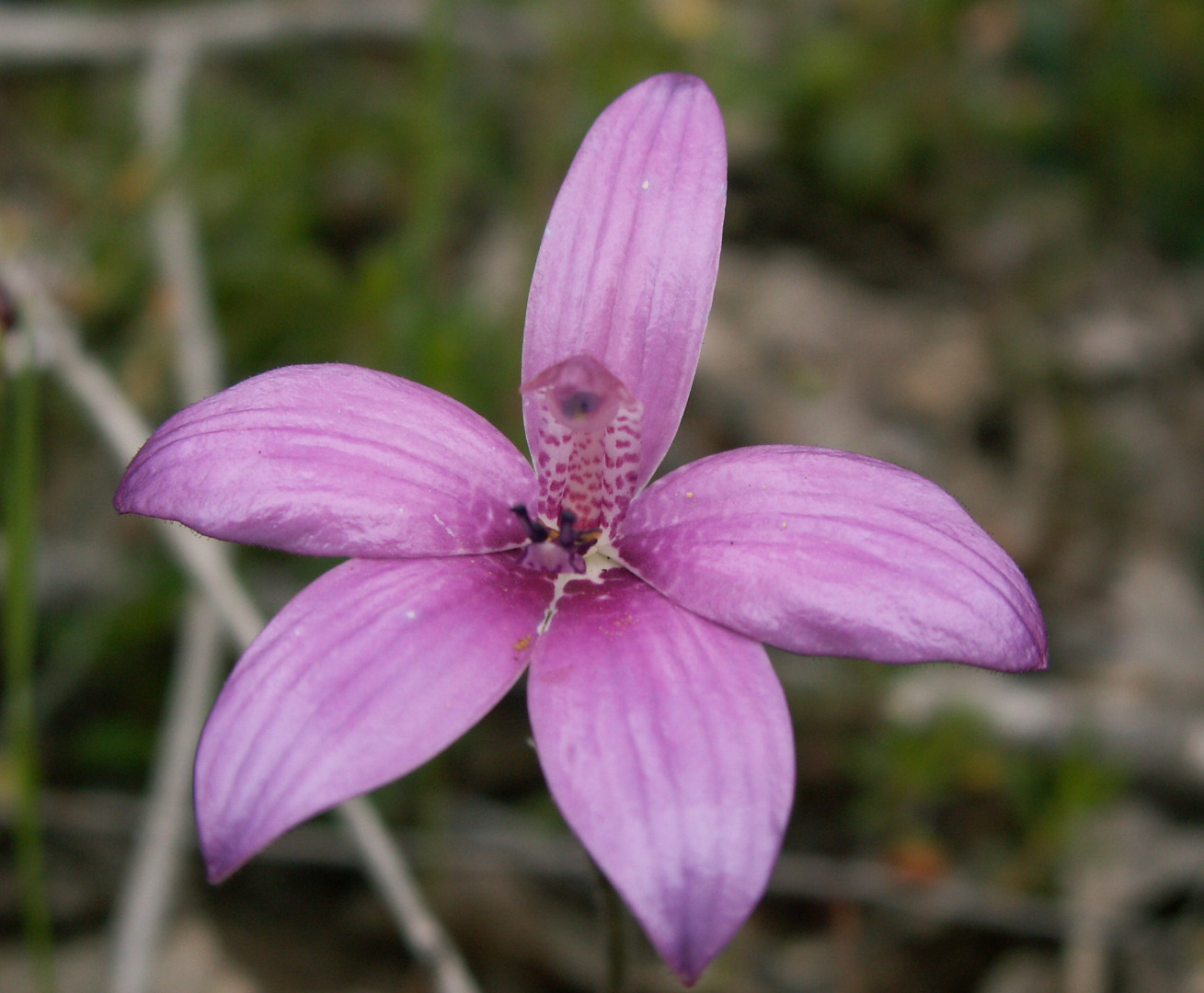
- Near Kirup

Scientific classification
- Kingdom: Plantae
- Clade: Embryophytes
- Clade: Tracheophytes
- Clade: Spermatophytes
- Clade: Angiosperms
- Clade: Monocots
- Order: Asparagales
- Family: Orchidaceae
- Subfamily: Orchidoideae
- Tribe: Diurideae
- Genus: Elythranthera
- Species: E. emarginata

Binomial name
- Elythranthera emarginata (Lindl.) A.S.George

Synonyms
- Caladenia emarginata (Lindl.) Rchb.f.; Glossodia emarginata Lindl.

= Elythranthera emarginata =

Pink enamel orchid

Species of orchid

Elythranthera emarginata, commonly known as the pink enamel orchid, is a plant in the orchid family Orchidaceae and is endemic to the south-west of Western Australia. It is a ground orchid with a single flattened, hairy leaf and up to four glossy pink flowers. It is similar to Caladenia brunonis but is usually a shorter plant but with larger, pink flowers.

== Description ==
Elythranthera emarginata is a terrestrial, perennial, deciduous, sympodial herb with a few inconspicuous, fine roots and a tuber partly surrounded by a fibrous, multi-layered protective sheath and often forms colonies. It has a single flattened, dark green, hairy leaf, 20–80 mm (0.8–3 in) long and about 7 mm (0.3 in) wide with a reddish base. Up to four glossy pink flowers 30–50 mm (1–2 in) long and wide are borne on a spike 120–250 mm (5–10 in) tall. The sepals and petals spread apart from each other and are blotched with red or purple on their backs. The dorsal sepal is erect, 16–23 mm (0.6–0.9 in) long and 6–8 mm (0.2–0.3 in) wide. The lateral sepals have similar dimensions to the dorsal sepal and the petals are 14–20 mm (0.6–0.8 in) long and 6–8 mm (0.2–0.3 in) wide. The labellum is membranous, 4–5 mm (0.16–0.20 in) long, about 1.5 mm (0.06 in) wide and whitish with its tip twisted into an S-shape. At the base of the labellum there are two fleshy, dark purple, club-shaped parallel calli 5–7 mm (0.2–0.3 in) long. Flowering occurs from October to December.

== Taxonomy and naming ==
The pink enamel orchid was first formally described in 1839 by John Lindley who gave it the name Glossodia emarginata in A Sketch of the Vegetation of the Swan River Colony. In 1963, Alex George transferred the species to Eythranthera as E. emarginata. The specific epithet (emarginata) is a Latin word meaning "notched at the apex" referring to the two labellum calli.

Elythranthera emarginata is regarded as a synonym of the name Caladenia emarginata which is accepted by the Royal Botanic Gardens, Kew.

== Distribution and habitat ==
Elythranthera emarginata is found as far north as Jurien Bay and as far east as Ravensthorpe, often forming colonies or clumps in swamps, near creeks and in dense heath.

== Conservation ==
Elythranthera emarginata is classified as "not threatened" by the Western Australian Government Department of Parks and Wildlife.
