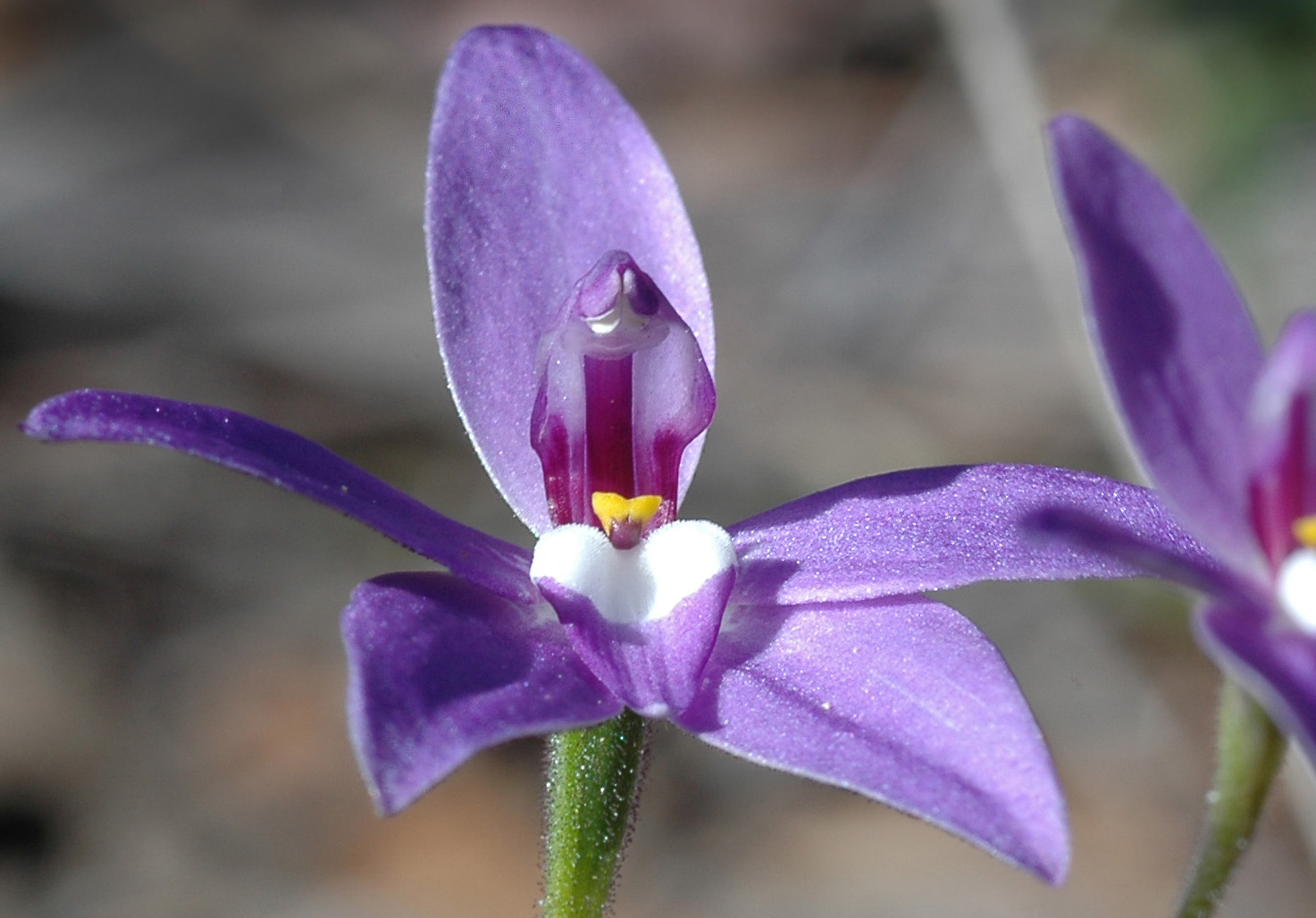
- In Tasmania

Scientific classification
- Kingdom: Plantae
- Clade: Embryophytes
- Clade: Tracheophytes
- Clade: Spermatophytes
- Clade: Angiosperms
- Clade: Monocots
- Order: Asparagales
- Family: Orchidaceae
- Subfamily: Orchidoideae
- Tribe: Diurideae
- Genus: Glossodia
- Species: G. major

Binomial name
- Glossodia major R.Br.

Synonyms
- Caladenia major (R.Br.) Rchb.f.; Glossodia major var. alba McKibbin; Glossodia major R.Br. var. major; Glossodia orientalis F.Muell. nom. illeg., nom. superfl. p.p.

= Glossodia major =

Waxlip orchid

Species of orchid endemic to Australia

Glossodia major, commonly known as the waxlip orchid, parson-in-the-pulpit, or purple cockatoo is a plant in the orchid family Orchidaceae, and is endemic to Australia. It is a ground orchid with a single hairy leaf and one or two purple to mauve flowers.

== Description ==
Glossodia major is a terrestrial, perennial, deciduous, herbaceous plant with an underground tuber. It has a single dark green, hairy, oblong to lance-shaped leaf, 30–60 mm (1–2 in) long and 15–20 mm (0.6–0.8 in) wide. One or two faintly fragrant flowers, 30–45 mm (1–2 in) long and wide are borne on a spike 80–350 mm (3–10 in) tall. The sepals and petals are purple to mauve except for their bases which are white with purple spots. Rarely, the flowers are all white. The dorsal sepal is 18–25 mm (0.7–1 in) long and 6–8 mm (0.2–0.3 in) wide. The lateral sepals are 18–25 mm (0.7–1 in) long and 7–10 mm (0.3–0.4 in) wide and spread apart from each other. The petals are 16–20 mm (0.6–0.8 in) long and 5–7 mm (0.2–0.3 in) wide and spread widely. The labellum is 7–10 mm (0.3–0.4 in) long, 5–7 mm (0.2–0.3 in) wide, white with a purple tip and with a furrow along its mid-line. At the base of the labellum there is a purple, cylinder-shaped appendage with two yellow, fleshy lobes on top. Flowering occurs from August to November.

== Taxonomy and naming ==
Glossodia major was first formally described in 1810 by Robert Brown in Prodromus Florae Novae Hollandiae. The specific epithet (major) is a Latin word meaning "greater".

== Distribution and habitat ==
Waxlip orchid occurs in all states of Australia except Western Australia and the Northern Territory. In New South Wales it is widespread and common in the eastern half of the state; in Victoria it is also widespread and common in most areas with suitable habitat; in South Australia it is common in the south-east, sometimes forming extensive colonies; in Tasmania it is widespread and common and in Queensland it grows in the south-east of that state. This orchid is found in a range of habitats from coastal heath to woodland and dry open forest.
