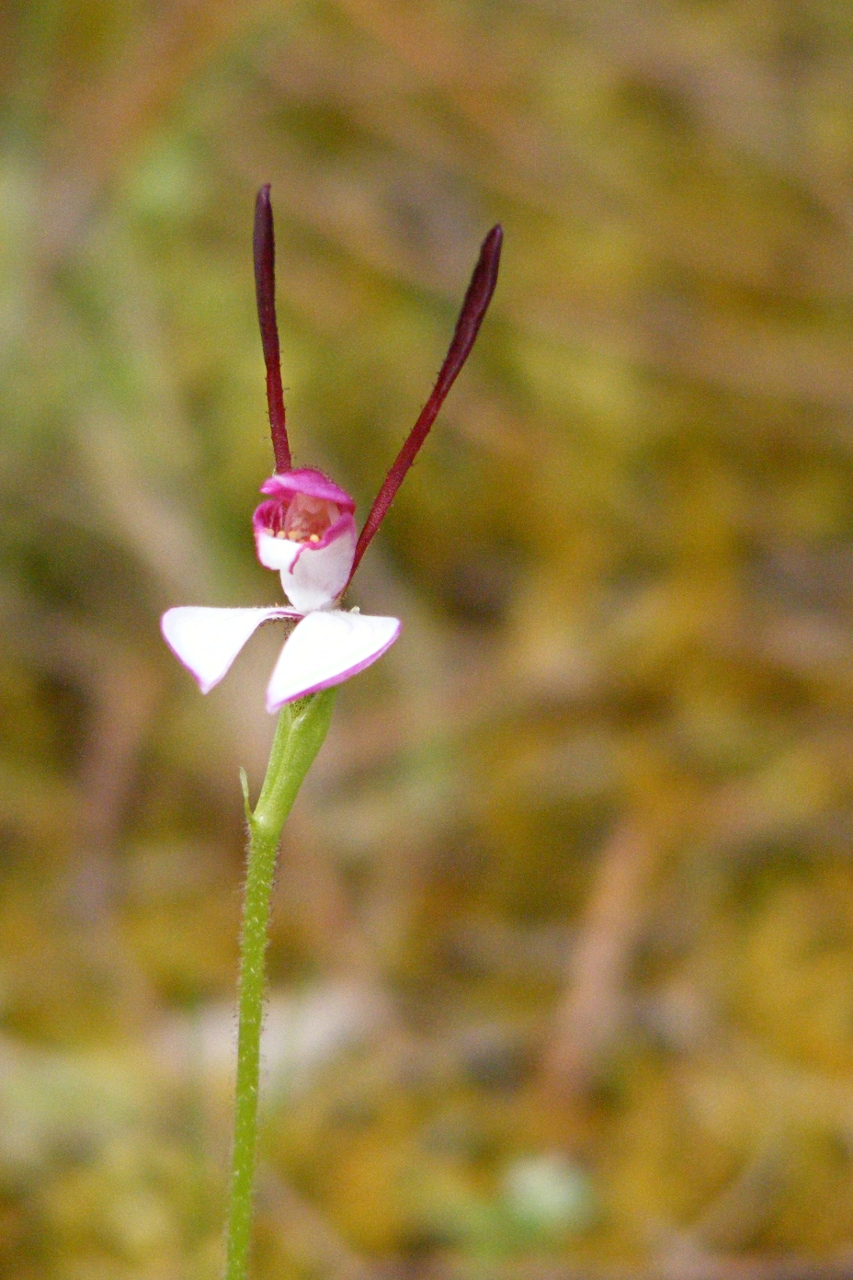
- Leptoceras menziesii near American River on Kangaroo Island

Scientific classification
- Kingdom: Plantae
- Clade: Tracheophytes
- Clade: Angiosperms
- Clade: Monocots
- Order: Asparagales
- Family: Orchidaceae
- Subfamily: Orchidoideae
- Tribe: Diurideae
- Subtribe: Caladeniinae
- Genus: Leptoceras; Lindl.
- Species: L. menziesii

Binomial name
- Leptoceras menziesii (R.Br.) Lindl.

= Leptoceras =

Rabbit orchid

Genus of orchids

Leptoceras menziesii, commonly known as rabbit orchid, is a plant in the orchid family, Orchidaceae and the only member of the genus Leptoceras. It is a slender plant, usually found in large colonies and which only flowers after fire. The flowers are small, white, pink and red on a stem up to 30 cm (10 in) tall and is endemic to southern Australia. It was one of the first orchids from Western Australia to be described and was given the name Caladenia menziesii, a name still used by some authorities.

== Description ==
The rabbit orchid is a tuberous perennial herb growing to a height of 6–20 cm (2–8 in), sometimes 30 cm (10 in) with one to three flowers. The leaf is glabrous, variable in size and shape but mostly lance-shaped to broadly egg-shaped to oblong, 30–120 mm (1–5 in) long and 5–23 mm (0.2–0.9 in) wide.

There are one to three small flowers, sometimes all white but more usually white, pink and red. The top sepal at the back of the flower is about 11 mm (0.4 in) long, dark reddish, spoon-shaped and forms a hood over the column. The back of the dorsal sepal has many glandular hairs. The lower, lateral sepals are white or pink, wide in the middle, taper towards both ends and 10–15 mm (0.4–0.6 in) long. The petals forming the "ears" are erect, purplish-red, very narrow linear in shape but club-shaped on the ends, 16–30 mm (0.6–1 in) long and have many glandular hairs. The central labellum is white with pink or red markings, egg-shaped to almost circular, about 7 mm (0.3 in) long and has a short claw. The labellum has 2 to 4 rows of calli with large heads. The column is erect with wide wings and pink markings. The species flowers from August to November, much more prolifically after recent bushfires, and delayed in some places until after rainfall.

== Taxonomy and naming ==
Caladenia menziesii was one of the first three orchids collected in Western Australia. Archibald Menzies was the collector of the holotype at King George Sound in 1791 during the Vancouver Expedition. It was first formally described by Robert Brown and the description was published in Prodromus Florae Novae Hollandiae et Insulae Van Diemen. In 1840, John Lindley changed the name to Leptoceras menziesii in The Genera and Species of Orchidaceous Plants. Some herbaria continue to use the old name. The specific epithet (menziesii) honours Archibald Menzies.

== Distribution and habitat ==
Rabbit orchid forms colonies using vegetative reproduction in a range of soil types in heath, scrub or forest, mainly in damp areas. It is widely distributed in Victoria, Tasmania, southern South Australia and the south-west of Western Australia.

== Conservation ==
Leptoceras menziesii is classified as "not threatened" by the Government of Western Australia Department of Parks and Wildlife.
