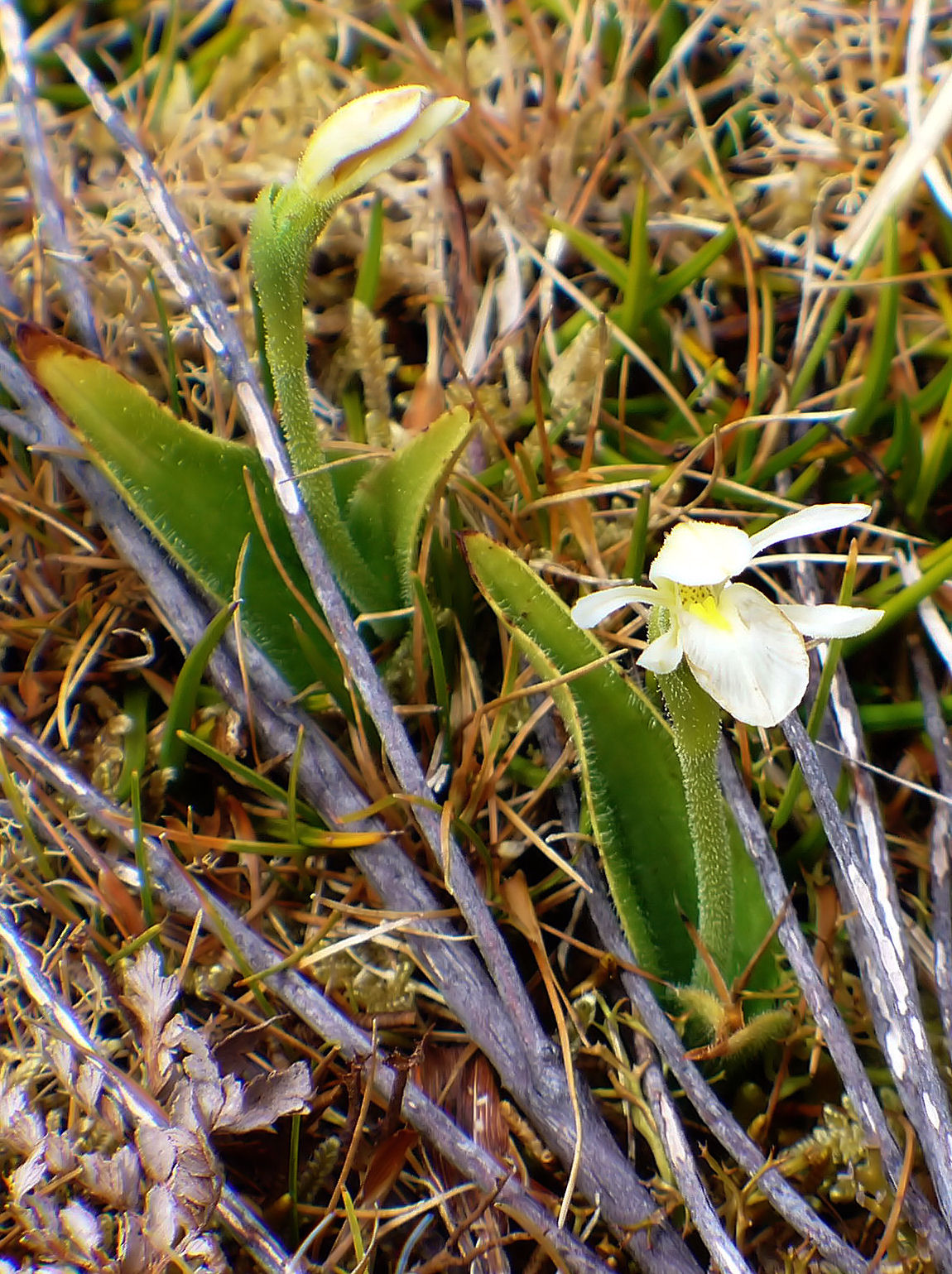
- Aporostylis bifolia

Scientific classification
- Kingdom: Plantae
- Clade: Tracheophytes
- Clade: Angiosperms
- Clade: Monocots
- Order: Asparagales
- Family: Orchidaceae
- Subfamily: Orchidoideae
- Tribe: Diurideae
- Subtribe: Caladeniinae
- Genus: Aporostylis; Rupp & Hatch
- Species: A. bifolia

Binomial name
- Aporostylis bifolia (Hook.f.) Rupp & Hatch

Synonyms
- Caladenia bifolia Hook.f.; Chiloglottis bifolia (Hook.f.) Schltr.; Chiloglottis traversii F.Muell.; Caladenia macrophylla Colenso

= Aporostylis =

Genus of flowering plants

Aporostylis is a genus of flowering plants from the orchid family, Orchidaceae. At the present time, only one species is known: Aporostylis bifolia, native to New Zealand (including the Chatham Islands and the Antipodes Islands).

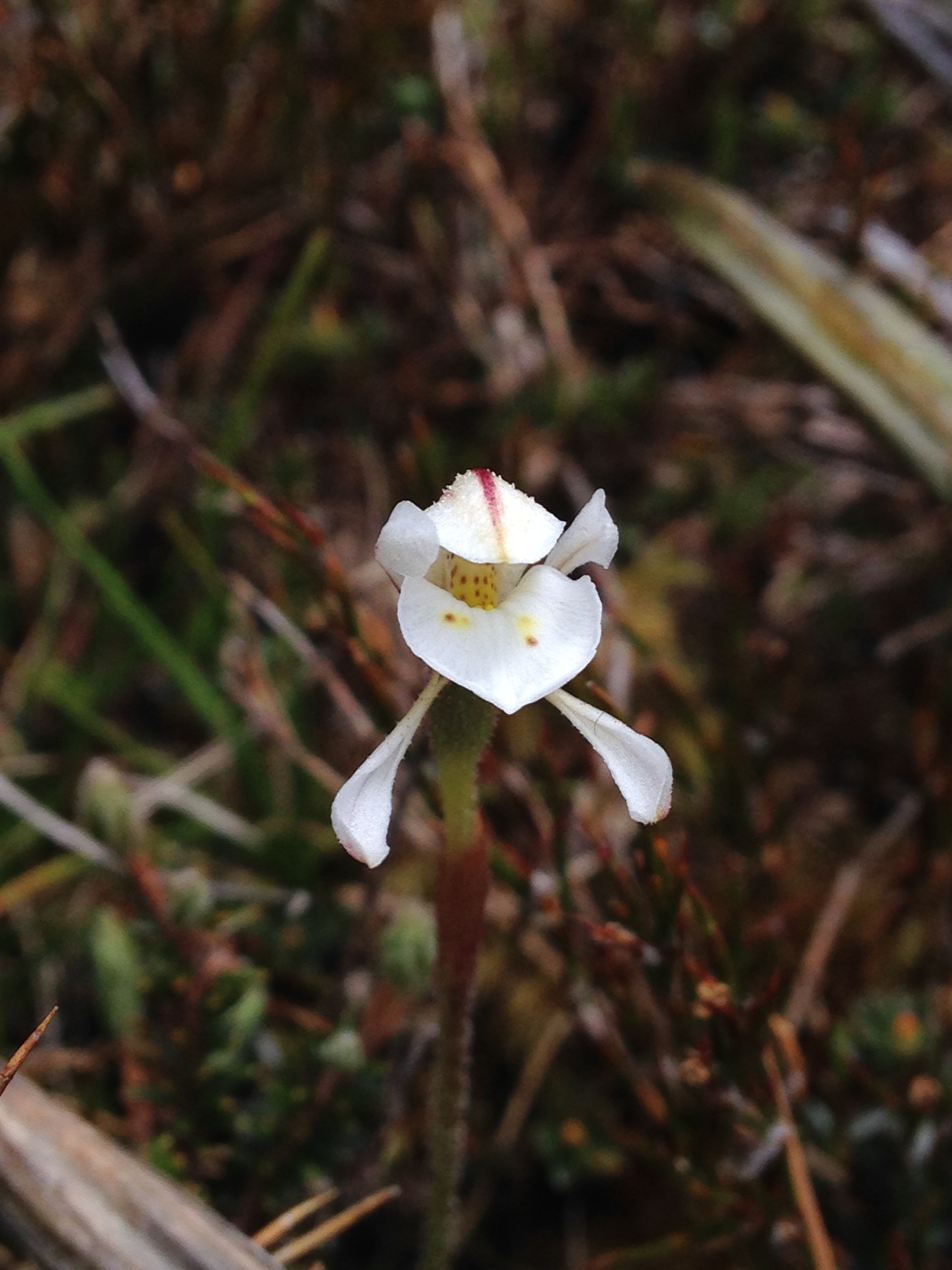
In Kahurangi National Park on alpine tussock land.

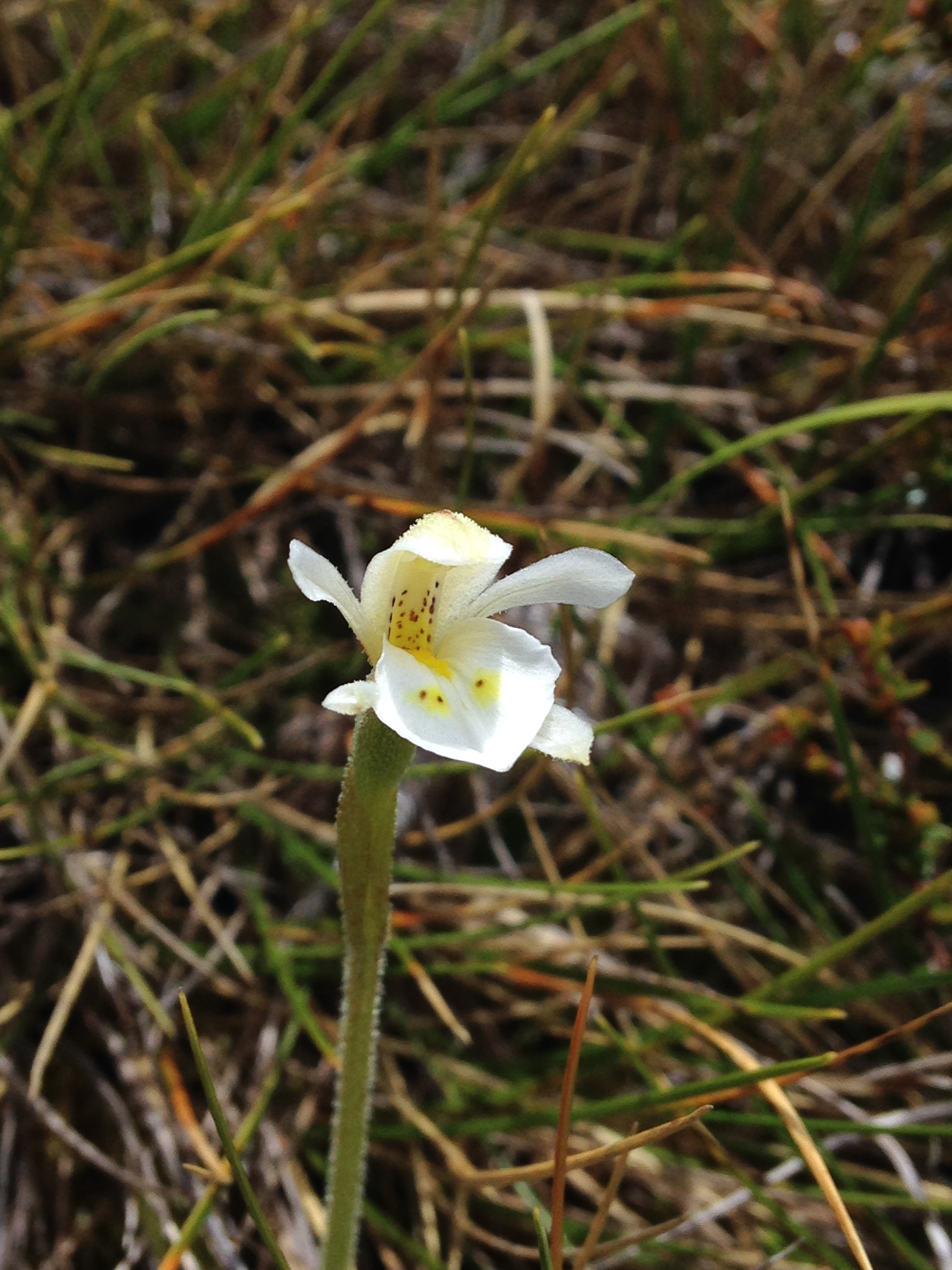
In Kahurangi National Park on alpine tussock land.

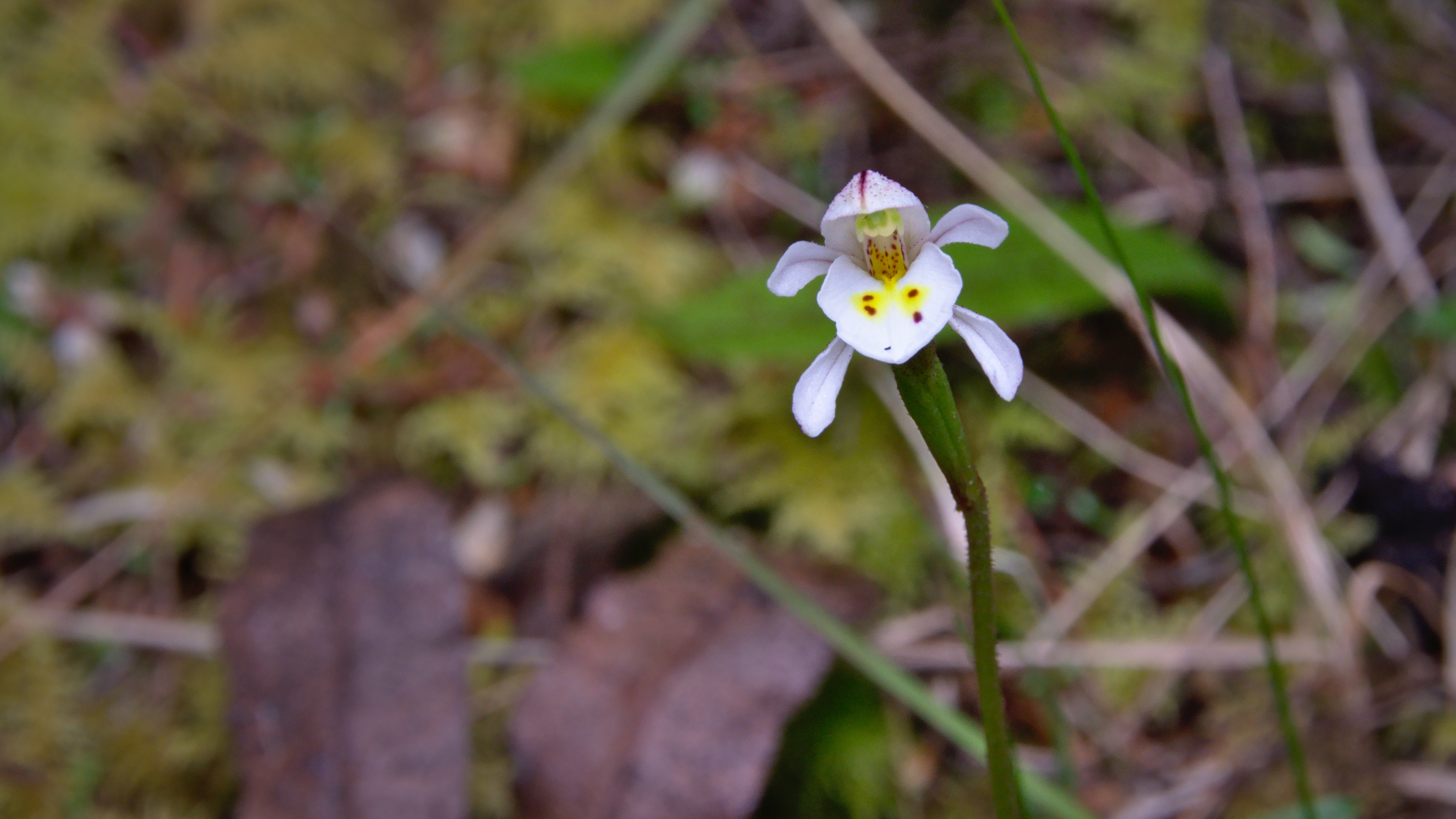
Near Dunedin, in the Silverpeaks.

== See also ==
- List of Orchidaceae genera
