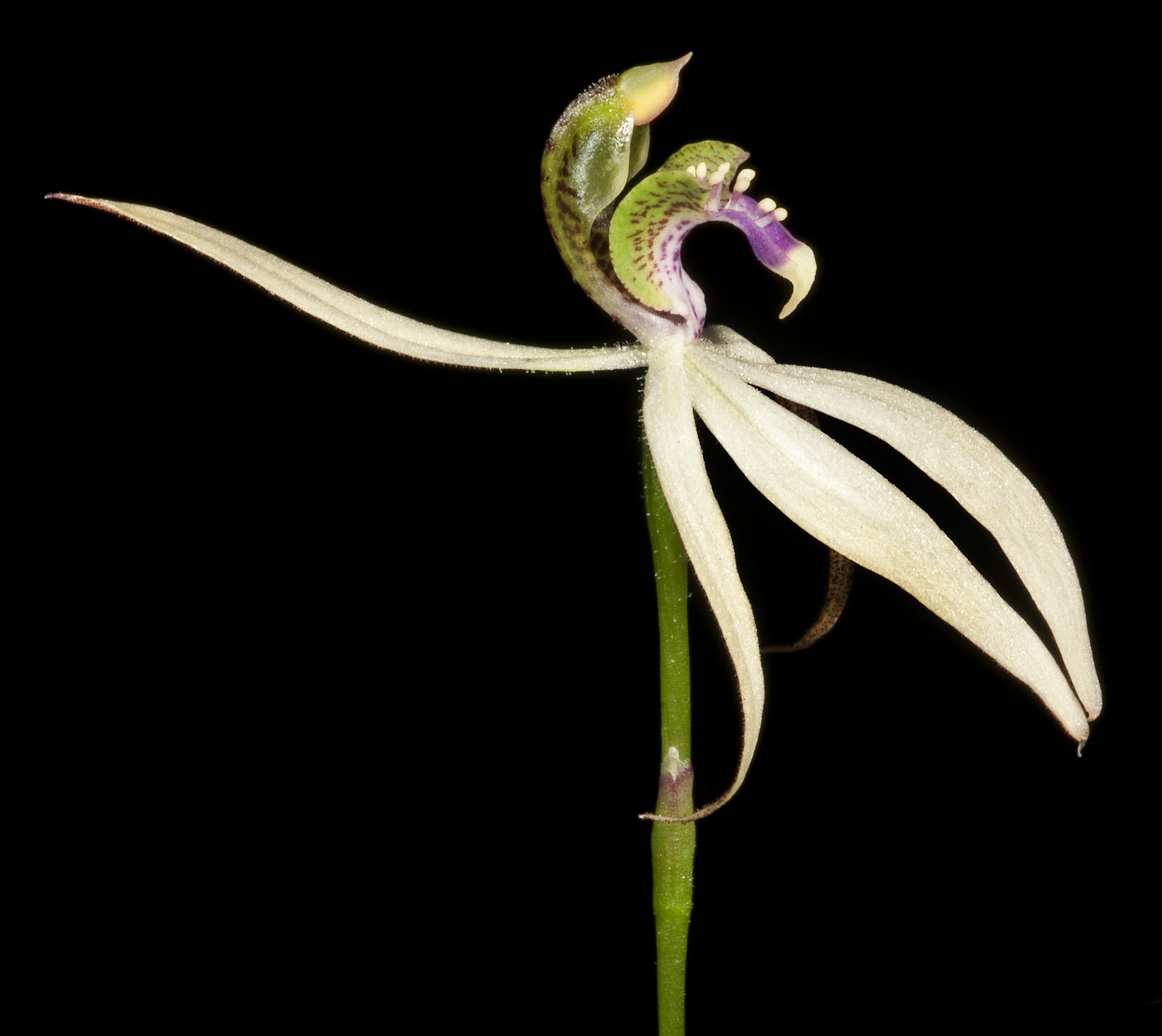
- Near Pinjarra

Scientific classification
- Kingdom: Plantae
- Clade: Embryophytes
- Clade: Tracheophytes
- Clade: Spermatophytes
- Clade: Angiosperms
- Clade: Monocots
- Order: Asparagales
- Family: Orchidaceae
- Subfamily: Orchidoideae
- Tribe: Diurideae
- Subtribe: Caladeniinae
- Genus: Praecoxanthus; Hopper & A.P.Br.
- Species: P. aphyllus

Binomial name
- Praecoxanthus aphyllus (Benth.) Hopper & A.P.Br.

Synonyms
- Caladenia aphylla Benth.; Praecoxanthus aphyllus N.Hoffman & A.P.Br. nom. inval.

= Praecoxanthus =

Leafless orchid

Genus of orchids

Praecoxanthus aphyllus, commonly known as leafless orchid, is the only species of the flowering plant genus Praecoxanthus in the orchid family, Orchidaceae and is endemic to the south-west of Western Australia. Plants in flower lack a true leaf, although those plants that are not flowering do possess a green leaf. This species is one of the first orchids to flower each year and its creamy white, fragrant flower easily distinguishes it from other species.

== Description ==
Praecoxanthus aphyllus is a terrestrial, perennial, deciduous, sympodial herb with a few inconspicuous, fine roots and a tuber partly surrounded by a fibrous sheath. The tuber produces a replacement "dropper" which becomes the daughter tuber in the following year. Non-flowering plants produce a single, stalkless, egg-shaped leaf which is 20–40 mm (0.8–2 in) long, 8–20 mm (0.3–0.8 in) wide and glabrous with prominent white veins. The leaf of flowering plants is reduced to a tiny bract at the base of the stem.

There is a single resupinate flower on the end of a wiry, glabrous stem 20–40 cm (8–20 in) high. The flower is 2–4 cm (0.8–2 in) wide and long. The three sepals and two petals are spreading, creamy-white, free and similar in size and shape to each other. As is usual in orchids, one petal is highly modified as the central labellum. The labellum has three lobes and is purple, green and yellow with two irregular rows of stalked, club-like calli. The sexual parts of the flower are fused to the column, which has wing-like structures on its sides and are widest at the base. Flowering occurs from March to May and the fruit that follows is a non-fleshy, hairy, dehiscent capsule containing a large number of seeds.

Labelled image

== Taxonomy and naming ==
Leafless orchid was first formally described in 1837 by George Bentham who gave it the name Caladenia aphylla and published the description in Flora Australiensis. In 2000, Stephen Hopper and Andrew Brown described the genus Praecoxanthus and included this species.

The genus name "Praecoxanthus" is derived from the Latin word praecox meaning "premature" or "precocious" and the Ancient Greek anthos meaning "flower". The specific epithet "aphyllus" is derived from the Ancient Greek prefix "a-" meaning "without" and phyllon meaning "leaf".

== Ecology ==
Leafless orchid flowers are highly fragrant and attract native bees. The yellow calli on a purple labellum resemble pollen-bearing stamens but the flower is nectarless, attracting the insects to an absent reward.

== Distribution and habitat ==
This orchid usually grows in sandy soils in woodland but near Esperance tends to grow in low heath with sub-soil moisture. Unlike some orchids, they do not usually grow in colonies and individuals are well-spaced. It occurs between Pinjarra and Albany and in a coastal strip east to Esperance in the Avon Wheatbelt, Esperance Plains, Jarrah Forest, Mallee, Swan Coastal Plain and Warren biogeographic regions.

== Conservation ==
Praecoxanthus aphyllus is classified as "Not Threatened" by the Western Australian Government Department of Parks and Wildlife.
