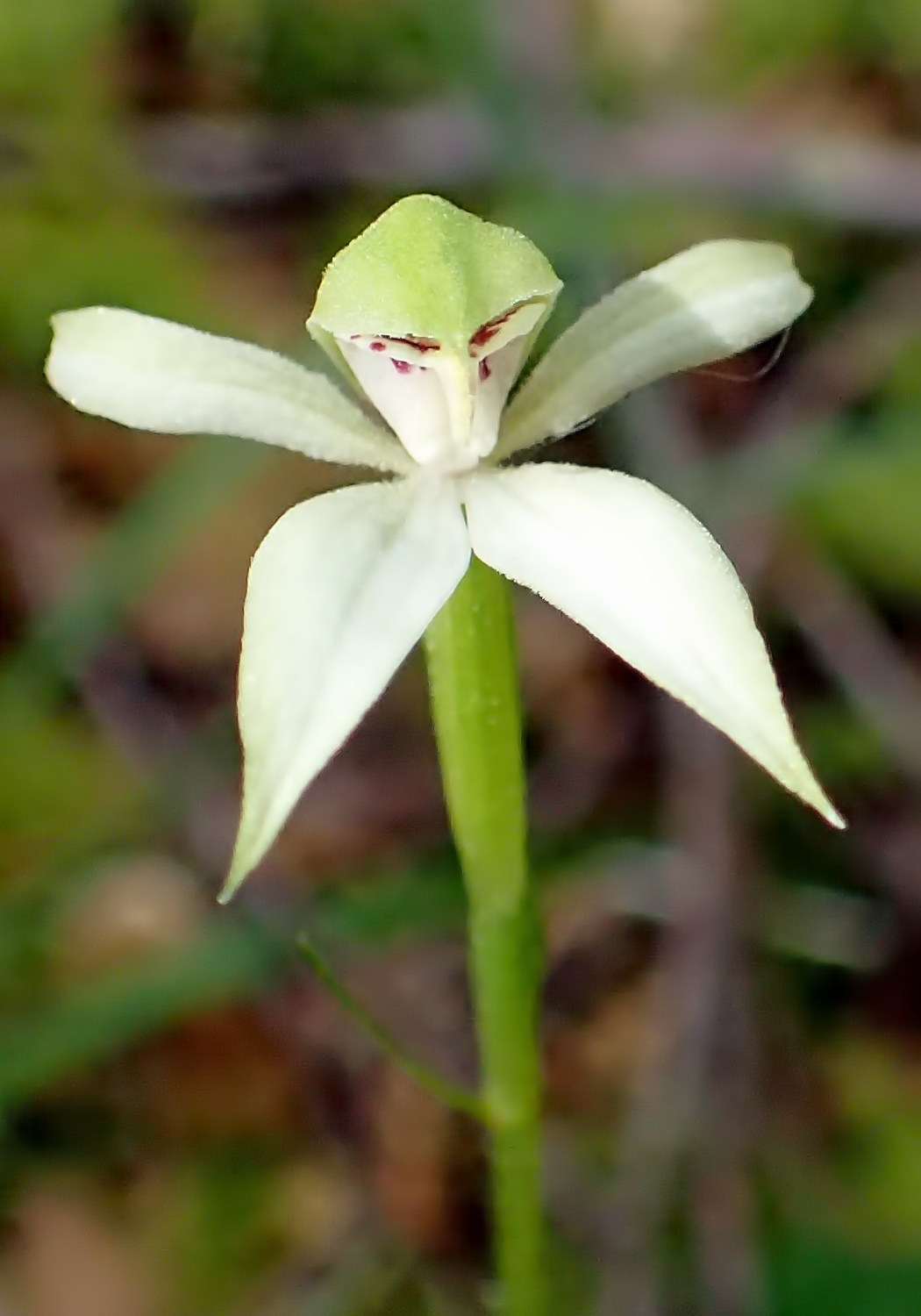
- Adenochilus gracilis near Makarora in New Zealand

Scientific classification
- Kingdom: Plantae
- Clade: Tracheophytes
- Clade: Angiosperms
- Clade: Monocots
- Order: Asparagales
- Family: Orchidaceae
- Subfamily: Orchidoideae
- Tribe: Diurideae
- Subtribe: Caladeniinae
- Genus: Adenochilus; Hook.f.

Type species
- Adenochilus gracilis Hook.f.

= Adenochilus =

Gnome orchids

Genus of flowering plants

Adenochilus, commonly known as gnome orchids is a genus of two species of flowering plants in the orchid family Orchidaceae, one endemic to New Zealand and the other to Australia. Both species have a long, horizontal, underground rhizome with a single leaf on the flowering stem and a single resupinate flower with its dorsal sepal forming a hood over the labellum and column.

== Description ==
Orchids in the genus Adenochilus are terrestrial, perennial, deciduous, sympodial herbs with a long, thin, horizontal underground rhizome and a single leaf either on a long stalk or attached to the flowering stem. When present, there is a single resupinate flower on the end of the flowering stem. The dorsal sepal is free and forms a hood over the labellum and column. The lateral sepals and petals are free from each other, longer and narrower than the dorsal sepal, and spread widely apart. The labellum is also free, attached at the base of the column by a short stalk or "claw". The labellum is curved and has a narrow central band of yellow calli.

== Taxonomy and naming ==
The genus Adenochilus was first formally described in 1853 by Joseph Dalton Hooker and the description was published in Flora Novae-Zelandiae. Hooker described A. gracilis in the same publication, making it the type species. The name Adenochilus is derived from the Ancient Greek words aden meaning "gland" and cheilos meaning "lip", referring to the labellum calli of these two species.

== Distribution and habitat ==
Adenochilus gracilis Hook.f. is widespread in New Zealand where it often grows in deep leaf litter under beech trees and sometimes near wetlands. It is found on both the North and South Islands and on Stewart and Chatham Islands.

Adenochilus nortonii Fitzg. has a restricted distribution in New South Wales, growing at altitudes of 400–1,000 m (1,300–3,300 ft) in the Blue Mountains, Barrington Tops and Point Lookout areas, often growing under Antarctic beech trees.

== See also ==
- List of Orchidaceae genera
