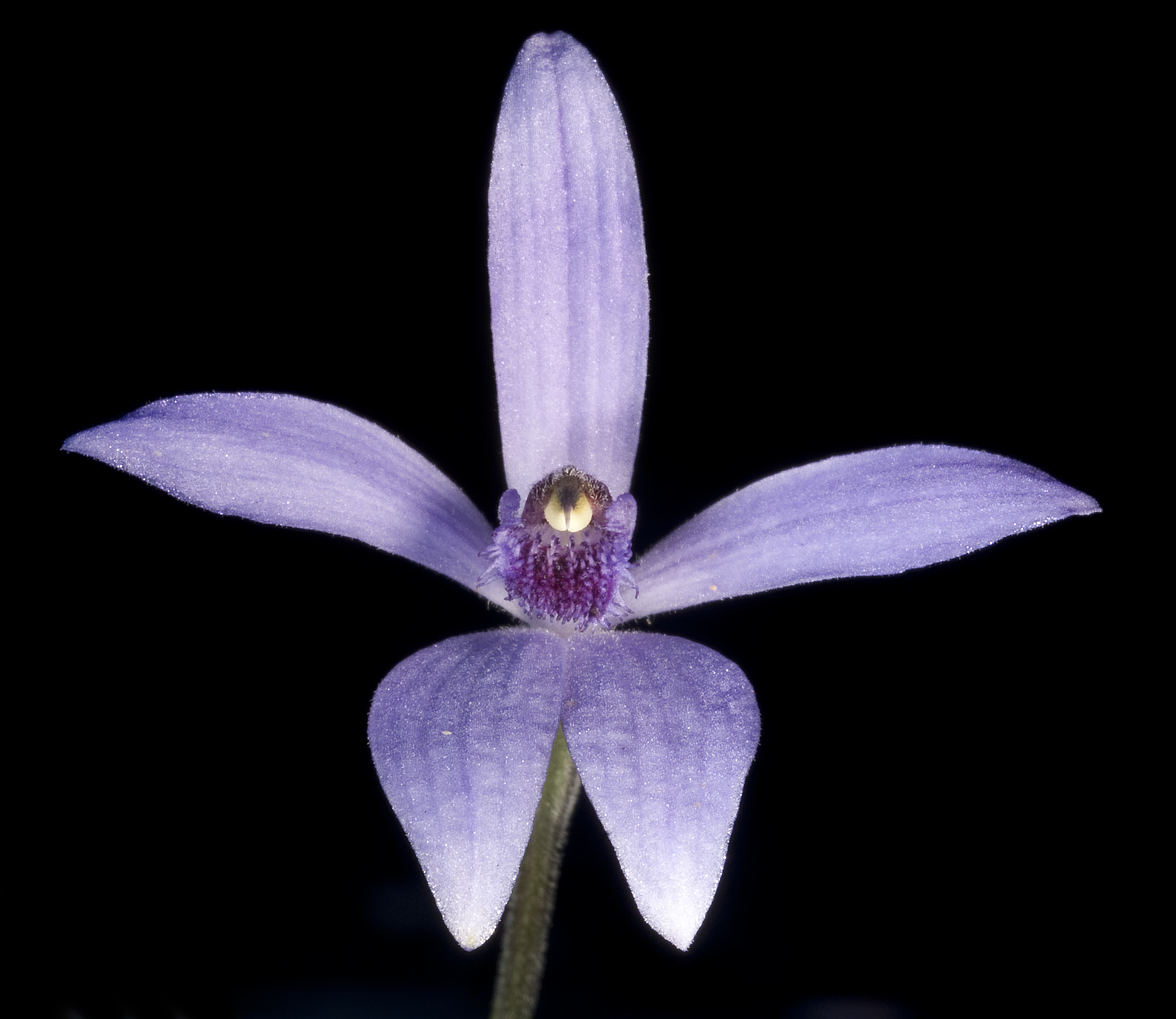
- Pheladenia deformis

Scientific classification
- Kingdom: Plantae
- Clade: Tracheophytes
- Clade: Angiosperms
- Clade: Monocots
- Order: Asparagales
- Family: Orchidaceae
- Subfamily: Orchidoideae
- Tribe: Diurideae
- Subtribe: Caladeniinae
- Genus: Pheladenia; D.L.Jones & M.A.Clem.
- Species: P. deformis

Binomial name
- Pheladenia deformis (R.Br.) D.L.Jones & M.A.Clem.

Synonyms
- Caladenia deformis R.Br.; Cyanicula deformis (R.Br.) Hopper & A.P.Br.; Pentisea deformis (R.Br.) Szlach.; Caladenia unguiculata Lindl.; Caladenia barbata Lindl.; Caladenia deformis var. albiflora Benth.; Caladenia deformis var. alba Guilf.

= Pheladenia =

Blue fairy orchid

Genus of orchids

Pheladenia deformis, commonly known as blue fairy orchid or blue beard is the only species of the flowering plant genus Pheladenia in the orchid family, Orchidaceae and is endemic to Australia. It was originally named as Caladenia deformis and has since had several name changes. Plants have a single, narrow, hairy leaf and usually blue flowers with relatively short, broad sepals and petals and an unusual labellum.

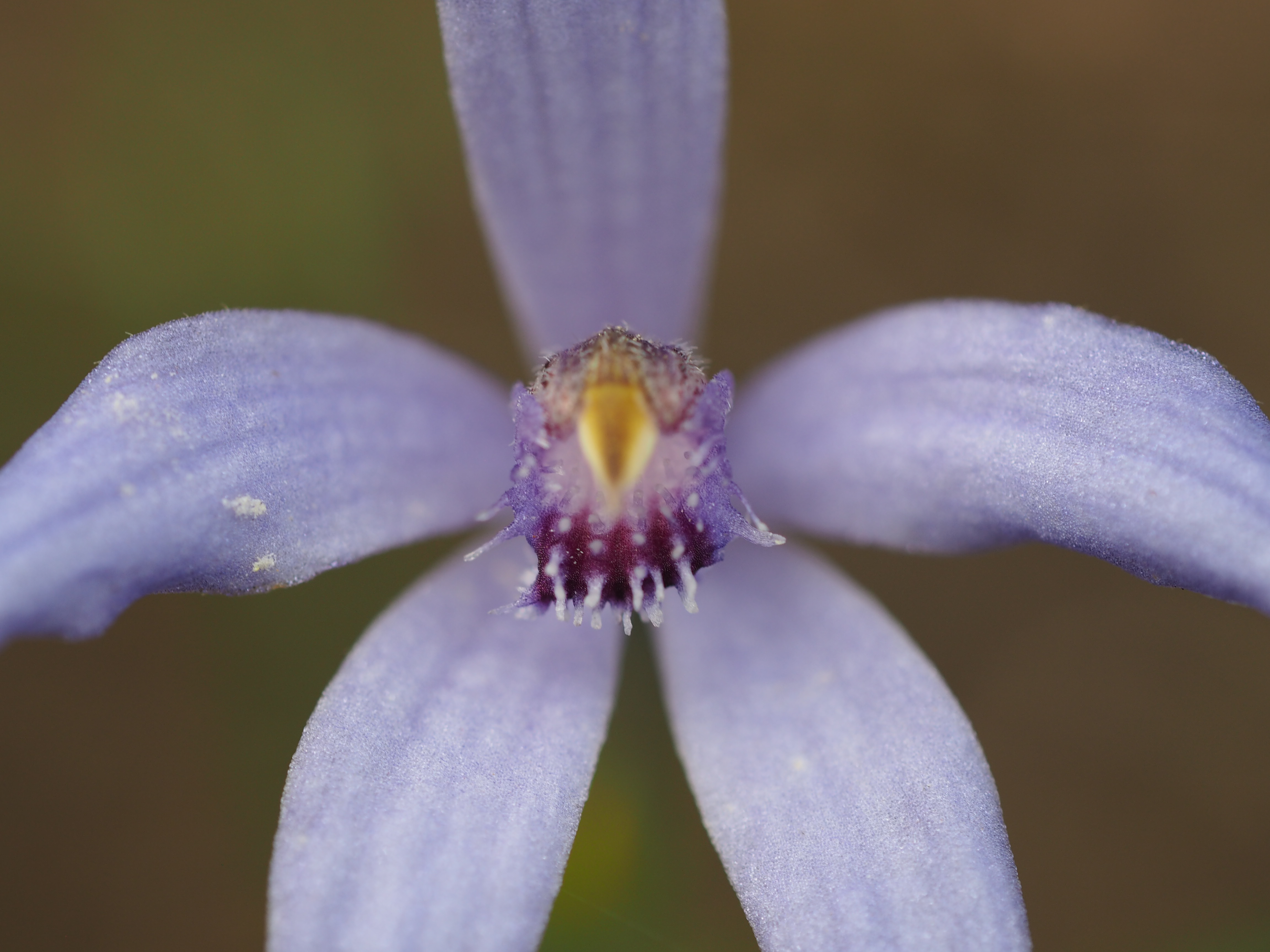
Pheladenia deformis labellum detail

== Description ==
Pheladenia deformis is a terrestrial, perennial, deciduous, sympodial herb with a few inconspicuous, fine roots and a tuber partly surrounded by a fibrous sheath. The tuber produces two "droppers" which become daughter tubers in the following year. There is a single hairy convolute leaf at the base of the plant. The leaf is linear, 3–10 cm (1–4 in) long and 2–5 mm (0.08–0.2 in) wide with a few hairs, especially on the edges, about 1 mm (0.04 in) long.

There is usually a single flower on a stem 5–15 cm (2–6 in) high. The three sepals and two lateral petals are 14–20 mm (0.6–0.8 in) long, 3–5 mm (0.1–0.2 in) wide. The outer surface usually has a few glandular hairs and the inner surface is bright blue, or sometimes white, pinkish or yellow. As is usual in orchids, one petal is highly modified as the central labellum. The labellum is dark blue near its tip, white near the base, 10–14 mm (0.4–0.6 in) long, 4–6 mm (0.16–0.24 in) wide. The edge of the labellum is fringed and there are many stalked calli, giving rise to the name blue beard . The column is 7–10 mm (0.3–0.4 in) long, 3–4 mm (0.1–0.2 in) wide.

== Taxonomy and naming ==
This species was first formally described in 1810 by Robert Brown who gave it the name Caladenia deformis. The description was published in Prodromus Florae Novae Hollandiae from a specimen collected at "Port Dalrymple", now George Town in Tasmania.

In 2000, Stephen Hopper and Andrew Brown changed the name to Cyanicula deformis and in 2001, David Jones and Mark Clements changed it to the present name.

The genus name (Pheladenia) is from the Ancient Greek words phelos meaning "deceitful" and aden meaning "gland", hence "false gland, alluding to the distinctive labellum call". The specific epithet (deformis) is a Latin word meaning "misshapen", again referring to the unusual labellum.

== Distribution and habitat ==
Blue fairy orchid grows in a variety of habitats, from the margins of swamps to granite outcrops, heath, woodland and forest. It occurs in all states of Australia except Queensland and the Northern Territory. In Western Australia it is found from north of Kalbarri to as far east as Israelite Bay on the south coast. In New South Wales it is uncommon but sometimes forms clumps on the Central West Slopes and South West Plains south from Molong.

== Conservation status ==
Pheladenia deformis is classified as "not threatened" in Western Australia, by the Western Australian Government Department of Parks and Wildlife.

== See also ==
- List of Orchidaceae genera
