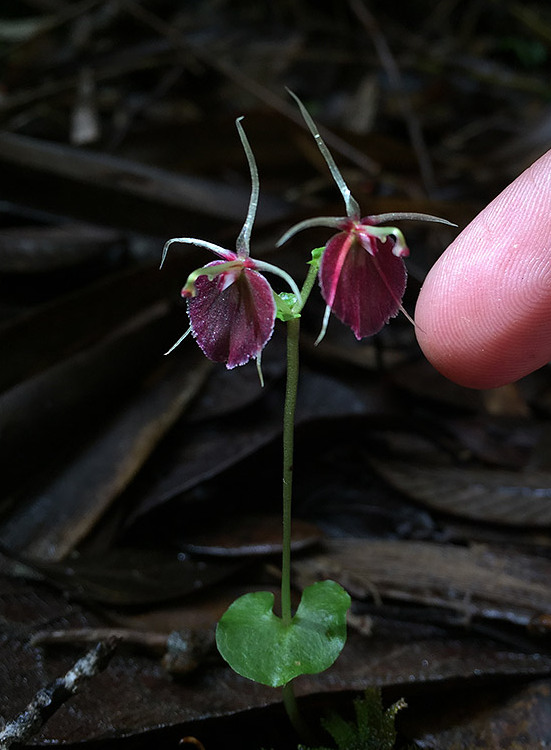
- A twin-flowered plant of the Palawan endemic orchid Stigmatodactylus dalagangpalawanicum

Scientific classification
- Kingdom: Plantae
- Clade: Tracheophytes
- Clade: Angiosperms
- Clade: Monocots
- Order: Asparagales
- Family: Orchidaceae
- Subfamily: Orchidoideae
- Tribe: Diurideae
- Subtribe: Acianthinae
- Genus: Stigmatodactylus; Maxim. ex Makino

Synonyms
- Pantlingia Prain; Univiscidiatus (Kores) Szlach.; Acianthopsis M.A.Clem. & D.L.Jones

= Stigmatodactylus =

Genus of flowering plants

Stigmatodactylus is a genus of flowering plants from the orchid family, Orchidaceae. It has 28 currently recognized species (as of March 2026), native to China, Taiwan, Japan, the Himalayas, the Philippines, Malaysia, Indonesia, New Guinea, Australia and the Solomon Islands.

== Species list ==
The following is a list of accepted species of Stigmatodactylus accepted by Plants of the World Online as at March 2026:

- Stigmatodactylus aegeridantennatus (N.Hallé) M.A.Clem. & D.L.Jones - New Caledonia
- Stigmatodactylus amplexicaulis (F.M.Bailey) S.P.Lyon, M.A.Clem. & D.L.Jones - Queensland, New South Wales, New Caledonia
- Stigmatodactylus aquamarinus A.S.Rob. & Gironella - Palawan (Philippines)
- Stigmatodactylus bracteatus (Rendle) M.A.Clem. & D.L.Jones - New Caledonia
- Stigmatodactylus celebicus Schltr. - Sulawesi
- Stigmatodactylus confusus (Guillaumin) M.A.Clem. & D.L.Jones - New Caledonia
- Stigmatodactylus corniculatus (Rendle) M.A.Clem. & D.L.Jones - New Caledonia
- Stigmatodactylus croftianus (Kores) Kores - New Guinea
- Stigmatodactylus cymbalariifolius (F.Muell. & Kraenzl.) M.A.Clem. & D.L.Jones - New Caledonia
- Stigmatodactylus dalagangpalawanicum A.S.Rob. - Palawan (Philippines)
- Stigmatodactylus elegans (Rchb.f.) M.A.Clem. & D.L.Jones - New Caledonia
- Stigmatodactylus gibbsiae (Kores) Kores - New Guinea
- Stigmatodactylus grandiflorus (Schltr.) M.A.Clem. & D.L.Jones - New Caledonia
- Stigmatodactylus halleanus (Kores) M.A.Clem. & D.L.Jones - New Caledonia
- Stigmatodactylus heptadactylus (Kraenzl.) M.A.Clem. & D.L.Jones - New Caledonia
- Stigmatodactylus javanicus Schltr. & J.J.Sm. - Java
- Stigmatodactylus lamrii (J.J.Wood & C.L.Chan) D.L.Jones & M.A.Clem. - Sabah
- Stigmatodactylus macroglossus (Schltr.) M.A.Clem. & D.L.Jones - New Caledonia
- Stigmatodactylus oxyglossus (Schltr.) M.A.Clem. & D.L.Jones - New Caledonia
- Stigmatodactylus paradoxus (Prain) Schltr. - Sikkim
- Stigmatodactylus richardianus P.T.Ong - Peninsular Malaysia
- Stigmatodactylus serratus (Deori) A.N.Rao - Assam
- Stigmatodactylus sikokianus Maxim. ex Makino - Fujian, Hunan, Taiwan, Japan
- Stigmatodactylus sublestus (Dockrill) S.P.Lyon, M.A.Clem., D.L.Jones - Queensland
- Stigmatodactylus tenuilabris (Schltr.) M.A.Clem. & D.L.Jones - New Caledonia
- Stigmatodactylus variegatus (Kores) Kores - New Guinea
- Stigmatodactylus veillonis (N.Hallé) M.A.Clem. & D.L.Jones - New Caledonia
- Stigmatodactylus vulcanicus (Schodde) Maek. - Solomon Islands

Stigmatodactylus antennatus, a species found in West Papua has been described by André Schuiteman, Reza Saputra, Jimmy F. Wanma and Charlie D. Heatubun in the journal Plants.

== See also ==
- List of Orchidaceae genera
