= Glossodia =

Genus of orchids

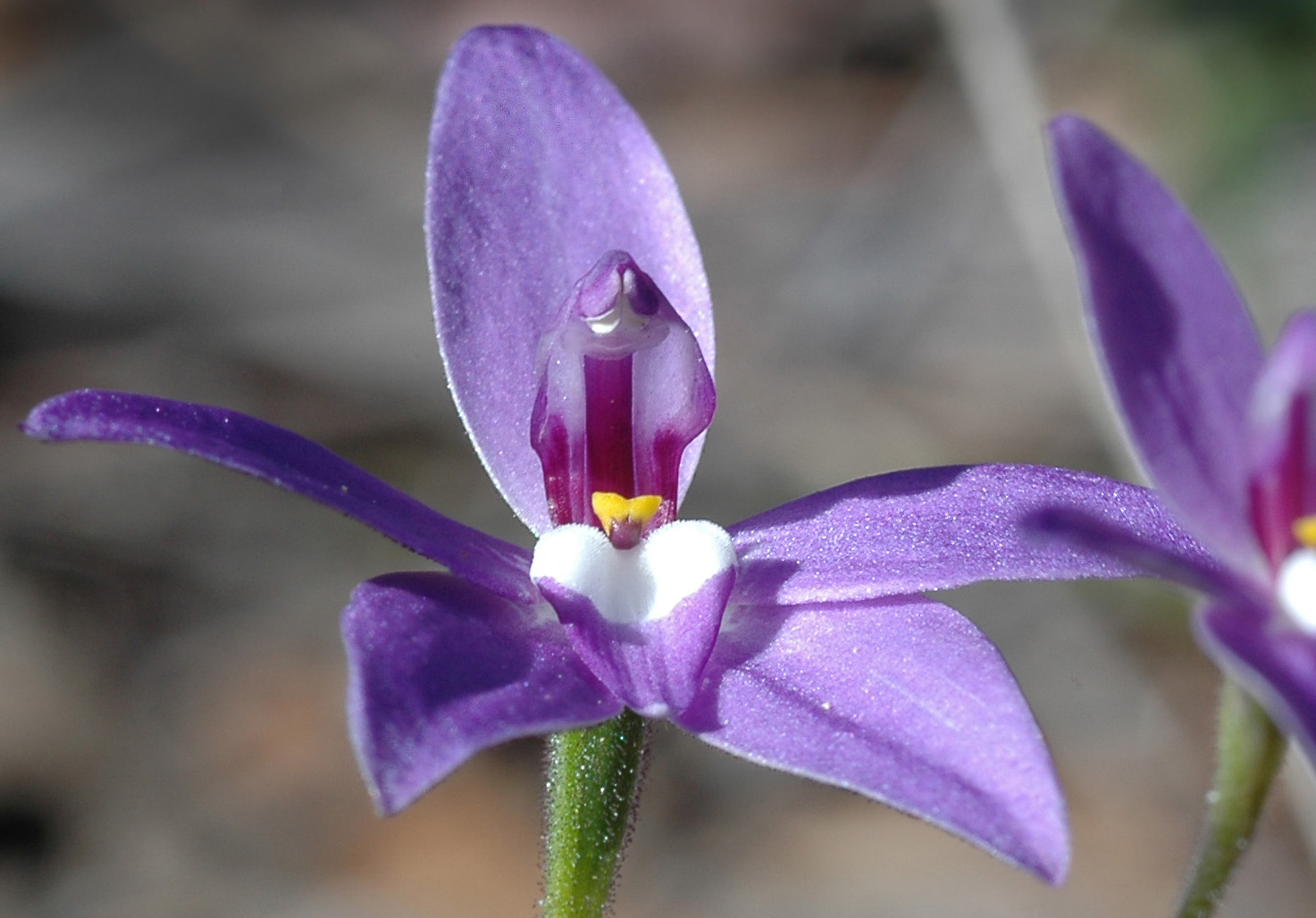
Glossodia major

Glossodia, commonly known as waxlip orchids, is a genus of mostly purple orchids from Australia. The genus was first formally described in 1810 by the prolific Scottish botanist Robert Brown who published his description in Prodromus Florae Novae Hollandiae.

Two species are recognised:

- Glossodia major R.Br. - waxlip orchid, native to Queensland, New South Wales, Victoria, Tasmania and South Australia;
- Glossodia minor R.Br. - small waxlip orchid, native to Queensland, New South Wales and Victoria.

In 2015, as a result of studies of molecular phylogenetics, Mark Clements transferred the two Glossodia species to Caladenia, but the change is not recognised by the Australian Plant Census.

Plants of the World Online lists Glossodia as a synonym of Caladenia.
