= Elythranthera =

Species of orchid

Elythranthera, commonly known as enamel orchids, is a genus of flowering plants in the orchid family, Orchidaceae. It contains two species and a named hybrid, all endemic to the south-west of Western Australia. The genus was first formally described in 1963 by the Australian botanist Alex George who published his description in Western Australian Naturalist.

Two species are recognised:

- Elythranthera brunonis (Endl.) A.S.George - purple enamel orchid;
- Elythranthera emarginata (Lindl.) A.S.George - pink enamel orchid.

A hybrid between the two species was known as Elythranthera x intermedia. (Fitzg.) M.A.Clem

In 2015, as a result of studies of molecular phylogenetics, Mark Clements transferred the two Elythranthera species to Caladenia but the change is not accepted by the Australian Plant Census, nor by the Western Australian Herbarium.

Plants of the World Online lists Elythranthera as a synonym of Caladenia.
