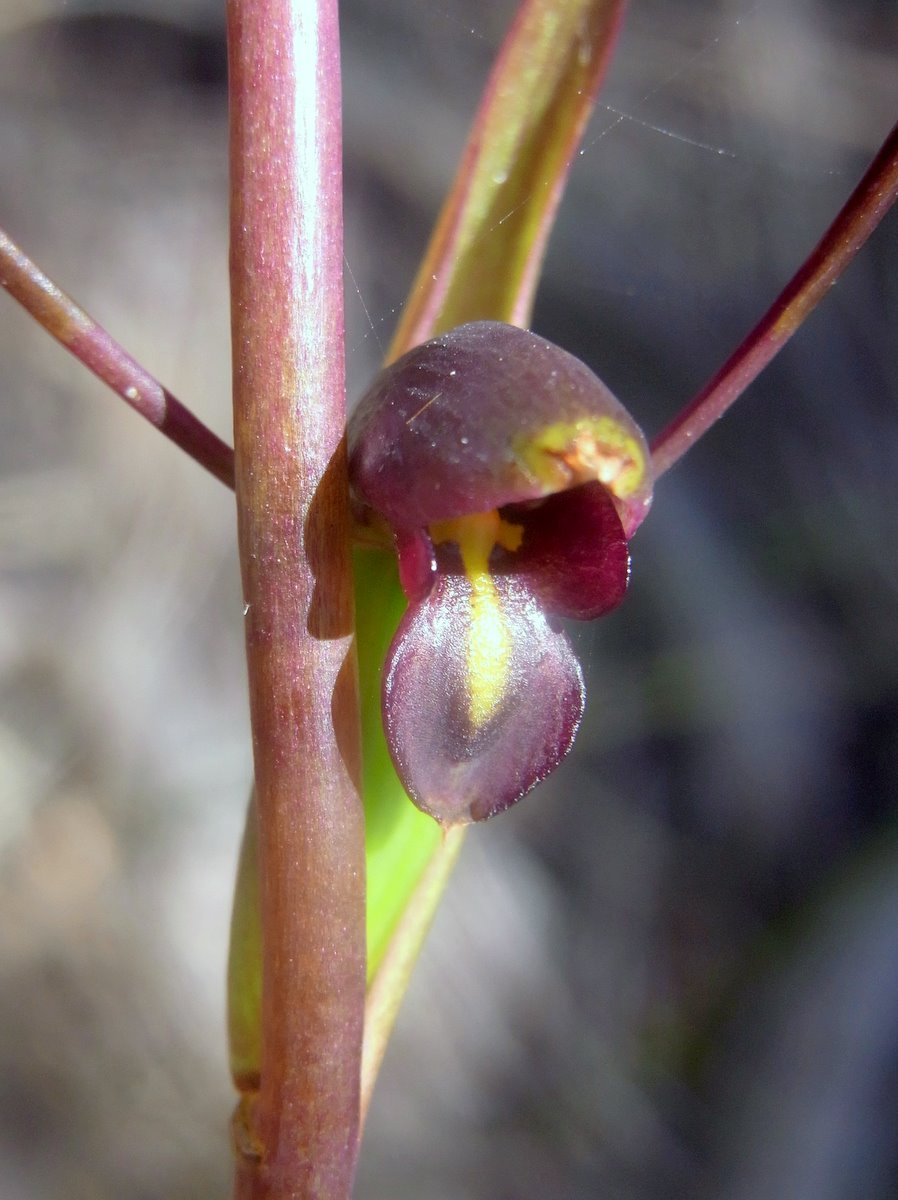
- Orthoceras strictum

Scientific classification
- Kingdom: Plantae
- Clade: Tracheophytes
- Clade: Angiosperms
- Clade: Monocots
- Order: Asparagales
- Family: Orchidaceae
- Subfamily: Orchidoideae
- Tribe: Diurideae (Endl.) Lindl. ex Meisn., Pl. Vasc. Gen.: Tab. Diagn. 387, Comm. 289. (1842)

Type genus
- Diuris Sm.

Subtribes
- Acianthinae; Caladeniinae; Cryptostylidinae; Diuridinae; Drakaeinae; Megastylidinae; Prasophyllinae; Rhizanthellinae; Thelymitrinae

= Diurideae =

Tribe of orchids

Diurideae is a tribe of orchids in the subfamily Orchidoideae. The tribe has a centre of diversity in Australia, with occasional dispersals to New Zealand, New Calendonia, Papua New Guinea, and Malesia.

== Infratribal classification ==
While Diurideae itself is a well-supported clade, relationships among its constituent subtribes remain equivocal, likely due to the confounding effects of incomplete lineage sorting. The tribe has previously been subdivided into nine subtribes: Acianthinae, Caladeniinae, Cryptostylidinae, Diuridinae, Drakaeinae, Megastylidinae, Prasophyllinae, Rhizanthellinae, and Thelymitrinae. However, phylogenomic analyses have shown that Megastylidinae is best subsumed into an expanded Drakaeinae. Rhizanthellinae has also been treated as a synonym of Prasophyllinae.

== Evolution and ecology ==
The tribe is estimated to have originated in the Eocene about 52 million years ago (Mya), with a crown age around 46 Mya. The tribe is known for an unusually high number of species that engage in sexually deceptive pollination, particularly in the subtribes Caladeniinae and Drakaeinae. Additionally, members of the Diurideae appear to have a high degree of fungal symbiont specificity, with orchid species partnering with an average of only one to two fungal species.

== Genera ==
The Diurideae contain about 40 accepted genera. Though s some have since been combined, Chase et al. (2015) accepted these genera:

- Acianthus R.Br.
- Adenochilus Hook.f.
- Aporostylis Rupp & Hatch
- Arthrochilus F.Muell.
- Burnettia Lindl.
- Caladenia R.Br.
- Caleana R.Br.
- Calochilus R.Br.
- Chiloglottis R.Br.
- Coilochilus Schltr.
- Corybas Salisb.
- Cryptostylis R.Br.
- Cyanicula Hopper & A.P.Brown = Caladenia
- Cyrtostylis R.Br.
- Diuris Sm.
- Drakaea Lindl.
- Elythranthera (Endl.) A.S.George
- Epiblema R.Br.
- Ericksonella Hopper & A.P.Br.
- Eriochilus R.Br.
- Genoplesium R.Br.
- Glossodia R.Br.
- Leporella A.S.George
- Leptoceras (R.Br.) Lindl.
- Lyperanthus R.Br.
- Megastylis (Schltr.) Schltr.
- Microtis R.Br.
- Orthoceras R.Br.
- Paracaleana Blaxell = Caleana
- Pheladenia D.L.Jones & M.A.Clem.
- Praecoxanthus Hopper & A.P.Brown
- Prasophyllum R.Br.
- Pyrorchis D.L.Jones & M.A.Clements
- Rhizanthella R.S.Rogers
- Rimacola Rupp
- Spiculaea Lindl.
- Stigmatodactylus Maxim. ex Makino
- Thelymitra J.R.Forst. & G.Forst.
- Townsonia Cheeseman
- Waireia D.L.Jones
