= List of the orchids of Western Australia =

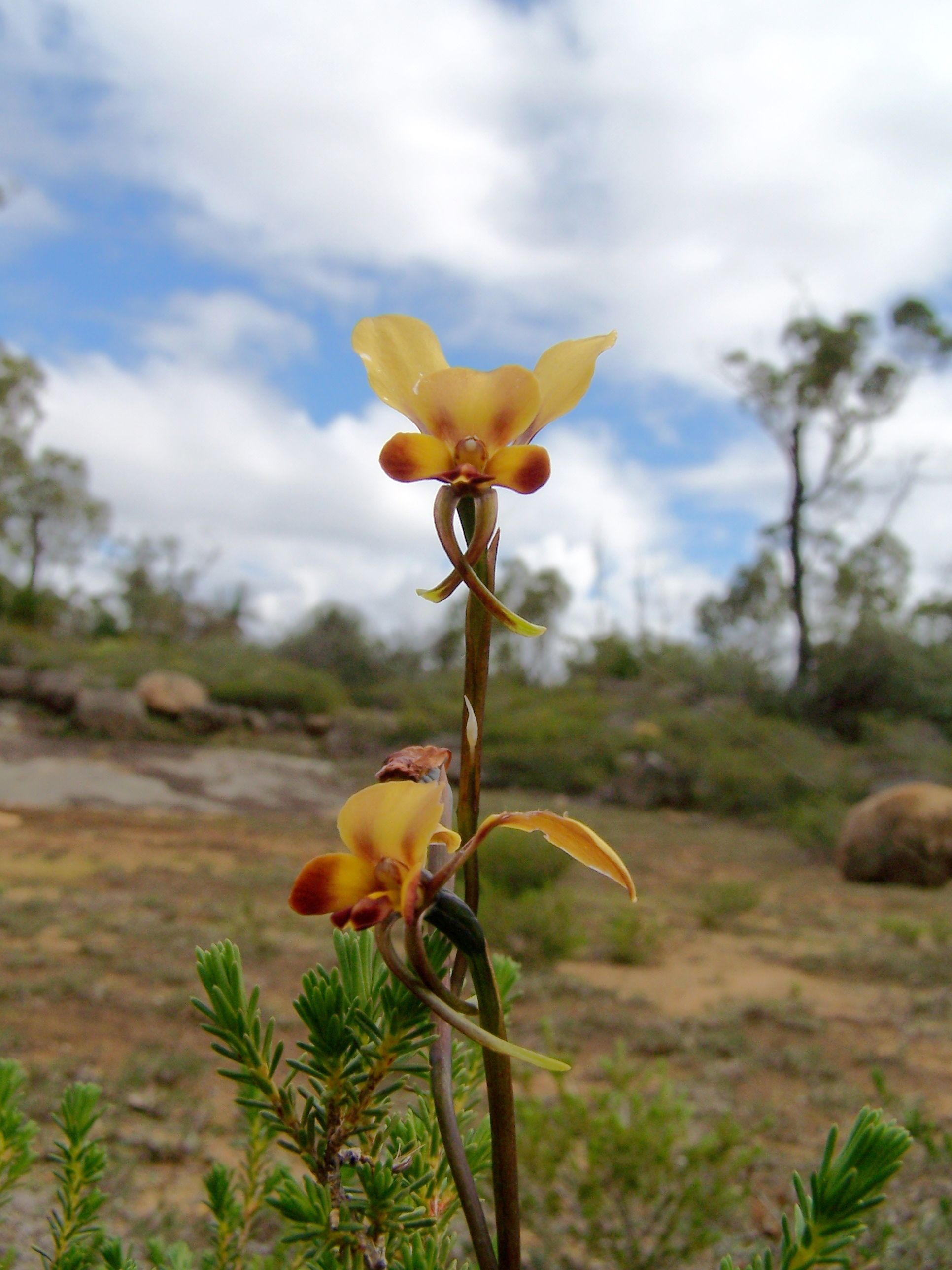
Diuris brumalis - Donkey Orchid

Among the many wildflowers in Western Australia, there are around four hundred species of orchids.

== Early identifications ==
One of the first botanists to study Western Australia was Archibald Menzies, aboard HMS Discovery, who explored King George Sound in 1791. Many of the samples (including orchids) were lost in the return to England, but those that did survive were documented in Prodromus Florae Novae Hollandiae et Insulae Van Diemen, published by Robert Brown in 1810.

The first three orchids from Western Australia to be named were Caladenia menziesii (now Leptoceras menziesii), Caladenia flava, and Diuris longifolia.

In 1802 Robert Brown himself collected 500 specimens of flora from Western Australia, including:

- Diuris emarginata var. emarginata
- Diuris emarginata var. pauciflora
- Diuris setacea
- Epiblema grandiflorum
- Microtis alba
- Microtis media
- Microtis pulchella
- Prasophyllum gibbosum
- Prasophyllum macrostachyum
- Thelymitra canaliculata
- Thelymitra tigrina
- Thelymitra fuscolutea

In West Australian Orchids (1930), Emily Pelloe described and illustrated an extensive survey. She provided an English text, paintings, and drawings for the amateur reader, a mixture of impression and scientific illustration of the genera.

== Orchids of South Western Australia ==
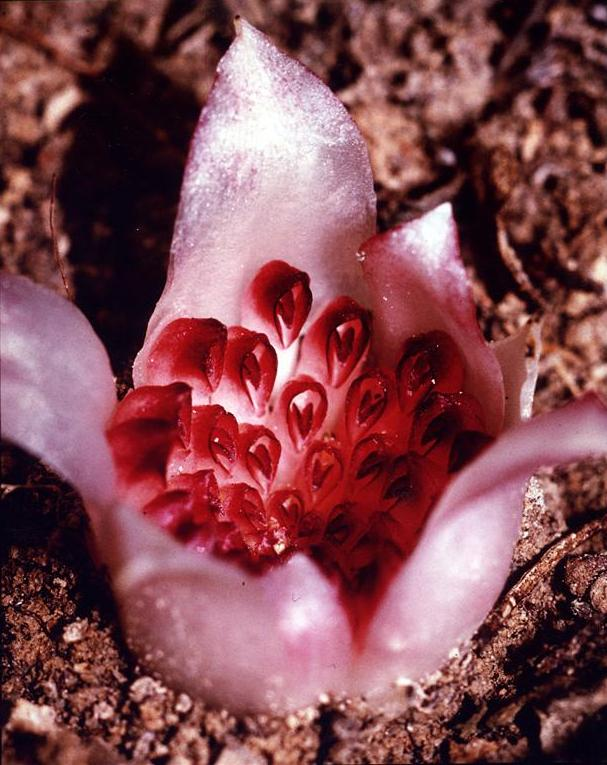
Rhizanthella gardneri

Common name	Genus	No. species in southwest W.A.	Remarks
Babe-in-a-cradle	Epiblema	1	
Beard orchids	Calochilus	6	
Blue orchids	Cyanicula	11	
Bunny orchids	Eriochilus	6	
Donkey orchid	Diuris	~36	
Duck orchids	Paracaleana	13	
Elbow orchid	Spiculaea	1	
Enamel orchids	Elythranthera	2	
Fairy orchid	Pheladenia	1	
Fire orchids	Pyrorchis	2	also Beak orchids
Greenhoods	Pterostylis	~90	
Hammer orchids	Drakaea	10	
Hare orchid	Leporella	1	
Helmet orchids	Corybas	4	
Leafless orchid	Praecoxanthus	1	
Leek orchids	Prasophyllum	25	
Mignonette orchids	Microtis	14	also Onion orchid
Mosquito orchids	Cyrtostylis	5	
Potato orchids	Gastrodia	1	also Bell orchid
Pygmy orchid	Corunastylis	1	
Rabbit orchid	Leptoceras	1	
Rattle beaks	Lyperanthus	1	
Slipper orchids	Cryptostylis	1	also Tongue orchid
South African orchids	Disa bracteata	1	introduced
Spider orchids	Caladenia	125	
Sugar orchid	Ericksonella	1	
Sun orchids	Thelymitra	37	
Underground orchids	Rhizanthella	1	

- This table has its source as the Second Edition of Hoffman and Brown in 1992
