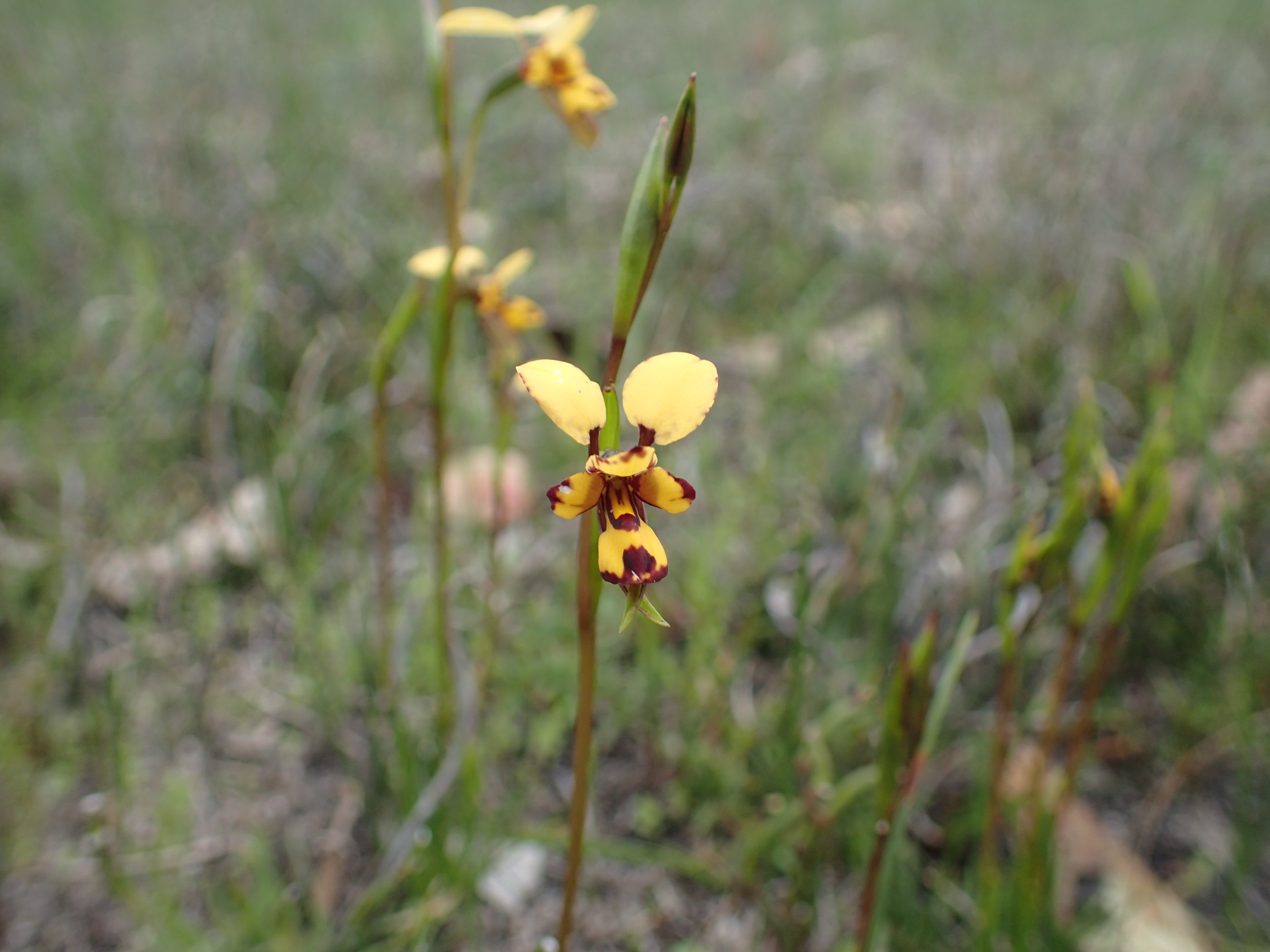
- In the Orchid Conservation Reserve near Tenterden

Scientific classification
- Kingdom: Plantae
- Clade: Embryophytes
- Clade: Tracheophytes
- Clade: Angiosperms
- Clade: Monocots
- Order: Asparagales
- Family: Orchidaceae
- Subfamily: Orchidoideae
- Tribe: Diurideae
- Genus: Diuris
- Species: D. decrementum

Binomial name
- Diuris decrementum D.L.Jones & C.J.French

= Diuris decrementum =

Common bee orchid

Species of orchid

Diuris decrementum, commonly called the common bee orchid, is a species of orchid which is endemic to the south-west of Western Australia. It is similar to the bee orchid (Diuris laxiflora) but its flowers are smaller and on a shorter flowering stem.

== Description ==
Diuris decrementum is a tuberous, perennial herb, usually growing to a height of 80–300 mm (3–10 in) with two to five leaves emerging at the base, each 50–120 mm (2–5 in) long and 1–2 mm (0.04–0.08 in) wide. There are up to three yellow flowers with brown blotches, 8–12 mm (0.3–0.5 in) wide. The flowers have broad, ear-like petals, an erect, tapering dorsal sepal and narrow, forward-projecting lateral sepals. The labellum has three lobes, the lateral ones small and spreading, and the middle lobe elongated with a raised mid-line. Flowering occurs from late August to early November.

== Taxonomy and naming ==
Diuris decrementum was first formally described in 2013 by David Jones and Christopher French and the description was published in Australian Orchid Review. The specific epithet (decrementum) is derived from the Latin word decrementum meaning "lessening" referring to the small flowers and shorter flowering stem of this species.

== Distribution and habitat ==
The common bee orchid occurs from near Perth to the east of Esperance where it grows in a range of habitats from woodlands to soil pockets on granite outcrops.

== Conservation ==
Diuris decrementum is classified as "not threatened" by the Western Australian Government Department of Parks and Wildlife.
