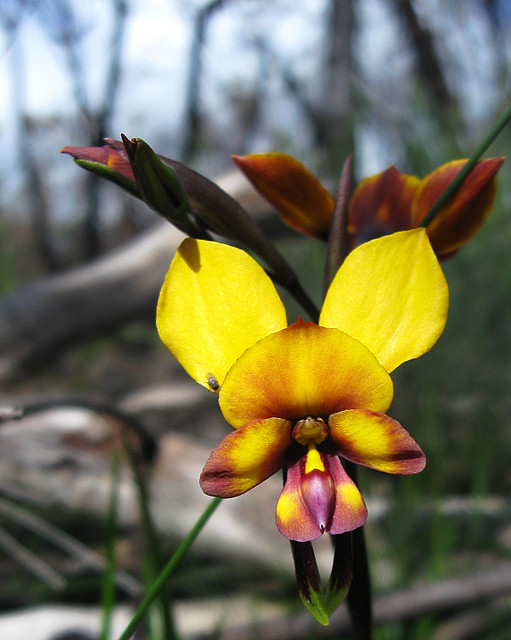
- In Kings Park

Scientific classification
- Kingdom: Plantae
- Clade: Embryophytes
- Clade: Tracheophytes
- Clade: Angiosperms
- Clade: Monocots
- Order: Asparagales
- Family: Orchidaceae
- Subfamily: Orchidoideae
- Tribe: Diurideae
- Genus: Diuris
- Species: D. magnifica

Binomial name
- Diuris magnifica D.L.Jones

= Diuris magnifica =

Large pansy orchid

Species of orchid

Diuris magnifica, commonly called the large pansy orchid, is a species of orchid which is endemic to the south-west of Western Australia. It has large, colourful flowers and is common in a narrow range near the coast around Perth, often occurring with the similar but smaller Diuris corymbosa.

== Description ==
Diuris magnifica is a tuberous, perennial herb, usually growing to a height of 300–600 mm (10–20 in). Two or three leaves emerge at the base, each leaf 120–220 mm (5–9 in) long, 18–24 mm (0.7–0.9 in) wide and folded lengthwise. There are between three and nine golden-yellow and purple flowers 40–60 mm (1.6–2.4 in) long and 30–50 mm (1–2 in) wide. The dorsal sepal is egg-shaped, 12–17 mm (0.5–0.7 in) long and 10–16 mm (0.4–0.6 in) wide and curves upwards. The lateral sepals are linear to lance-shaped, 16–26 mm (0.6–1 in) long, about 3 mm (0.1 in) wide, turned downwards and usually crossed. The petals are erect with an egg-shaped blade 20–30 mm (0.8–1 in) long and 12–14 mm (0.5–0.6 in) wide on a purplish-brown stalk 4–6 mm (0.16–0.24 in) long. The labellum is mauve or purple with some yellow markings, 13–18 mm (0.5–0.7 in) long and has three lobes. The centre lobe is wedge-shaped, 8–14 mm (0.3–0.6 in) long and 9–15 mm (0.4–0.6 in) wide and the side lobes are 10–16 mm (0.4–0.6 in) long and 5–8 mm (0.2–0.3 in) wide. There is a single yellow, ridged callus 2–3 mm (0.08–0.1 in) long in the mid-line of the labellum. The species is similar to several other Diuris including D. corymbosa and D. amplissima but is distinguished from them by its size, flowering period and distribution. Flowering occurs from late August to October.

== Taxonomy and naming ==
Diuris magnifica was first formally described in 1991 by David Jones from a specimen collected in a reserve near Kwinana and the description was published in Australian Orchid Review. The specific epithet (magnifica) is a Latin word meaning "noble", "eminent" or "splendid" referring to the large, colourful flowers of this orchid.

== Distribution and habitat ==
The large pansy orchid is common in near coastal shrubland and woodland between Lancelin and Mandurah in the Geraldton Sandplains, Jarrah Forest and Swan Coastal Plain biogeographic regions. At the northern end of its distribution, this species hybridises with the as yet undescribed Arrowsmith pansy orchid (Diuris sp. 'Eneabba') and in the south with D. corymbosa.

== Conservation ==
Diuris magnifica is classified as "not threatened" by the Western Australian Government Department of Parks and Wildlife.
