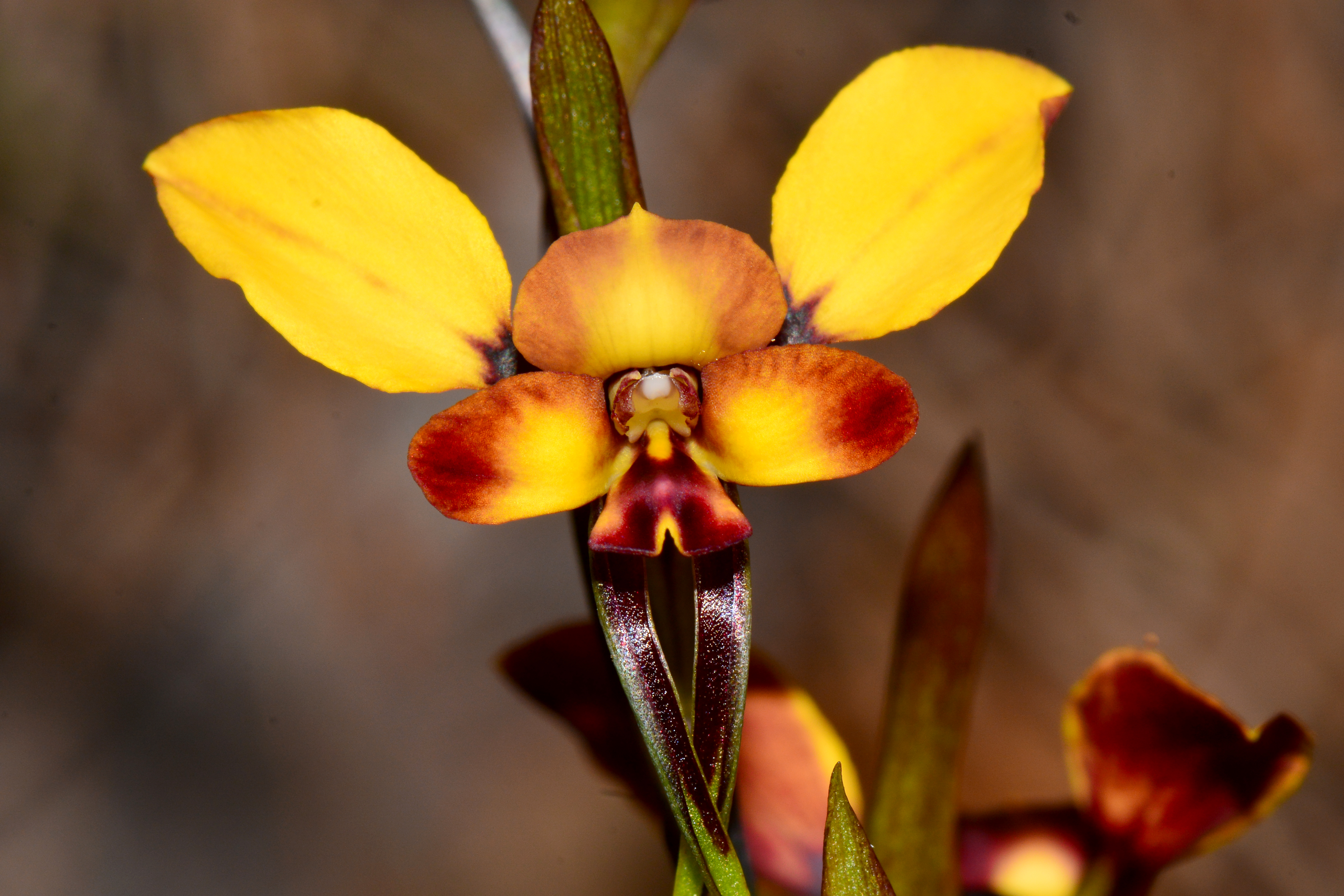
- In Wandoo National Park

Scientific classification
- Kingdom: Plantae
- Clade: Embryophytes
- Clade: Tracheophytes
- Clade: Angiosperms
- Clade: Monocots
- Order: Asparagales
- Family: Orchidaceae
- Subfamily: Orchidoideae
- Tribe: Diurideae
- Genus: Diuris
- Species: D. porrifolia

Binomial name
- Diuris porrifolia Lind.

= Diuris porrifolia =

Small-flowered donkey orchid

Species of orchid

Diuris porrifolia, commonly called the small-flowered donkey orchid is a species of orchid which is endemic to the south-west of Western Australia. It has two or three leaves and up to seven yellow flowers with brown or reddish markings. It is similar to the common donkey orchid (D. corymbosa) but its flowers are smaller and it has a more easterly distribution.

== Description ==
Diuris porrifolia is a tuberous, perennial herb with two or three leaves 100–200 mm (4–8 in) long and 8–13 mm (0.3–0.5 in) wide. There are up to seven yellow flowers with brown or reddish markings, 18–25 mm (0.7–1 in) long and wide on a flowering stem 150–350 mm (6–10 in) high. The dorsal sepal is erect, 7–10 mm (0.3–0.4 in) long and 8–10 mm (0.3–0.4 in) wide. The lateral sepals point downwards, 15–19 mm (0.6–0.7 in) long and about 3 mm (0.1 in) wide. The petals are more or less erect, 10–13 mm (0.4–0.5 in) long and 5–7 mm (0.2–0.3 in) wide on a stalk 4–6 mm (0.16–0.24 in) long. The middle lobe of the labellum is wedge-shaped with a central fold, 5–6 mm (0.20–0.24 in) long and 4.5 mm (0.2 in) wide and the side lobes are 6–8 mm (0.2–0.3 in) long and 3–4 mm (0.1–0.2 in) wide. Flowering occurs from late July to September.

This species is similar to D. corymbosa but has smaller flowers and a more easterly distribution. It has also been confused with the recently described (2016) western wheatbelt donkey orchid (D. brachyscapa) which has larger flowers and a more westerly distribution.

== Taxonomy and naming ==
Diuris porrifolia was first formally described in 1840 by John Lindley and the description was published in A Sketch of the Vegetation of the Swan River Colony as an appendix to Edwards's Botanical Register. The specific epithet (porrifolia) is derived from the Latin words porrum meaning "a leek" and folium meaning "leaf", referring to the shape of the leaves of this species.

The Index Kewensis lists this name as a synonym of Diuris corymbosa.

== Distribution and habitat ==
The small-flowered donkey orchid occurs between Perth and Boyup Brook in the south-west of Western Australia, where it grows in woodland and forest.

== Conservation ==
Diuris porrifolia is classified as "not threatened" by the Western Australian Government Department of Parks and Wildlife.
