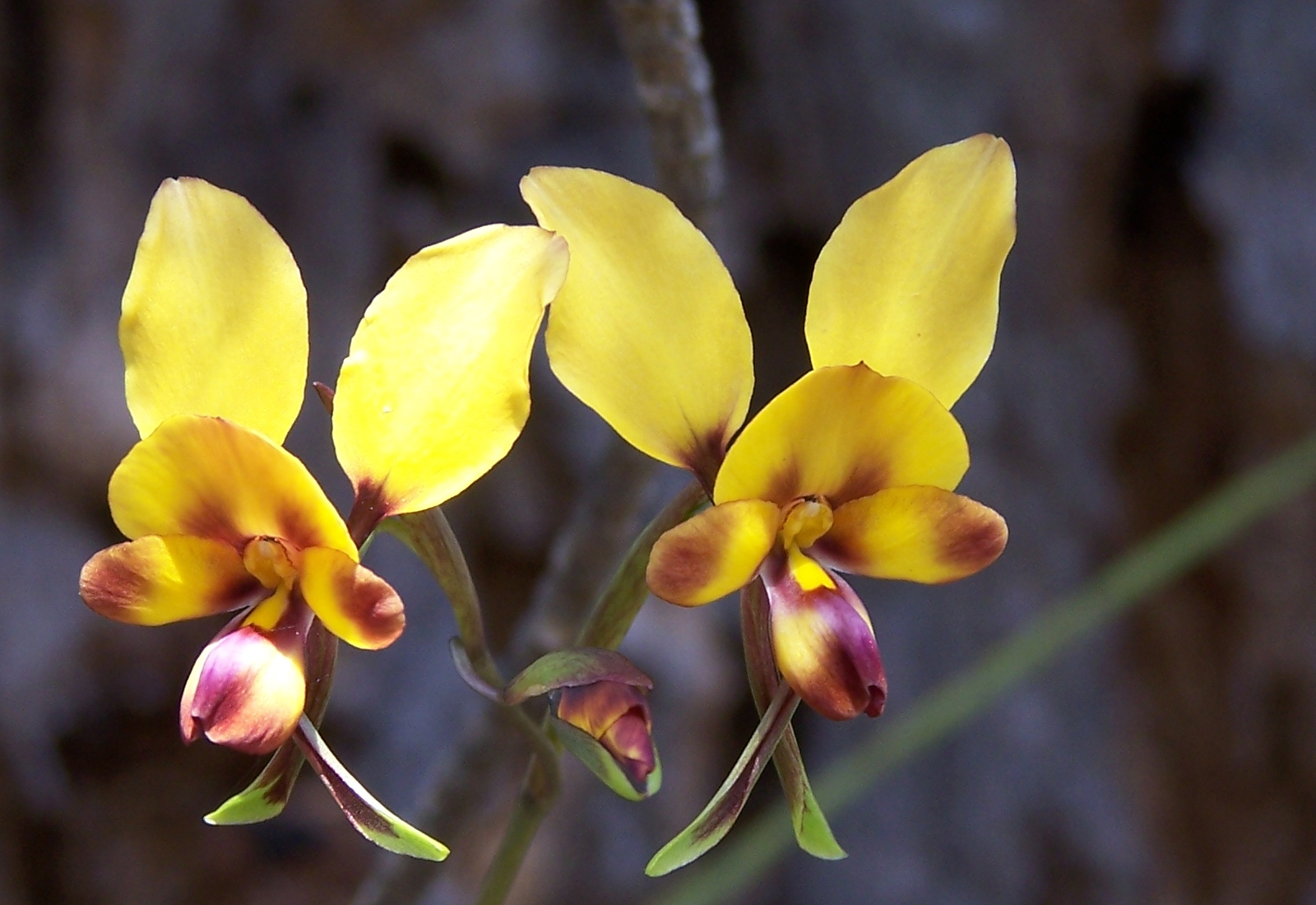
- Diuris corymbosa

Scientific classification
- Kingdom: Plantae
- Clade: Tracheophytes
- Clade: Angiosperms
- Clade: Monocots
- Order: Asparagales
- Family: Orchidaceae
- Subfamily: Orchidoideae
- Tribe: Diurideae
- Subtribe: Diuridinae; Lindl.

Genera
- Diuris; Orthoceras

= Diuridinae =

Subtribe of plants

Diuridinae is an orchid subtribe in the tribe Diurideae.
