= Epiblema =

Epiblema may refer to:

- Epiblema (moth), an insect genus in the family Tortricidae
- Epiblema (plant), a plant genus in the family Orchidaceae
