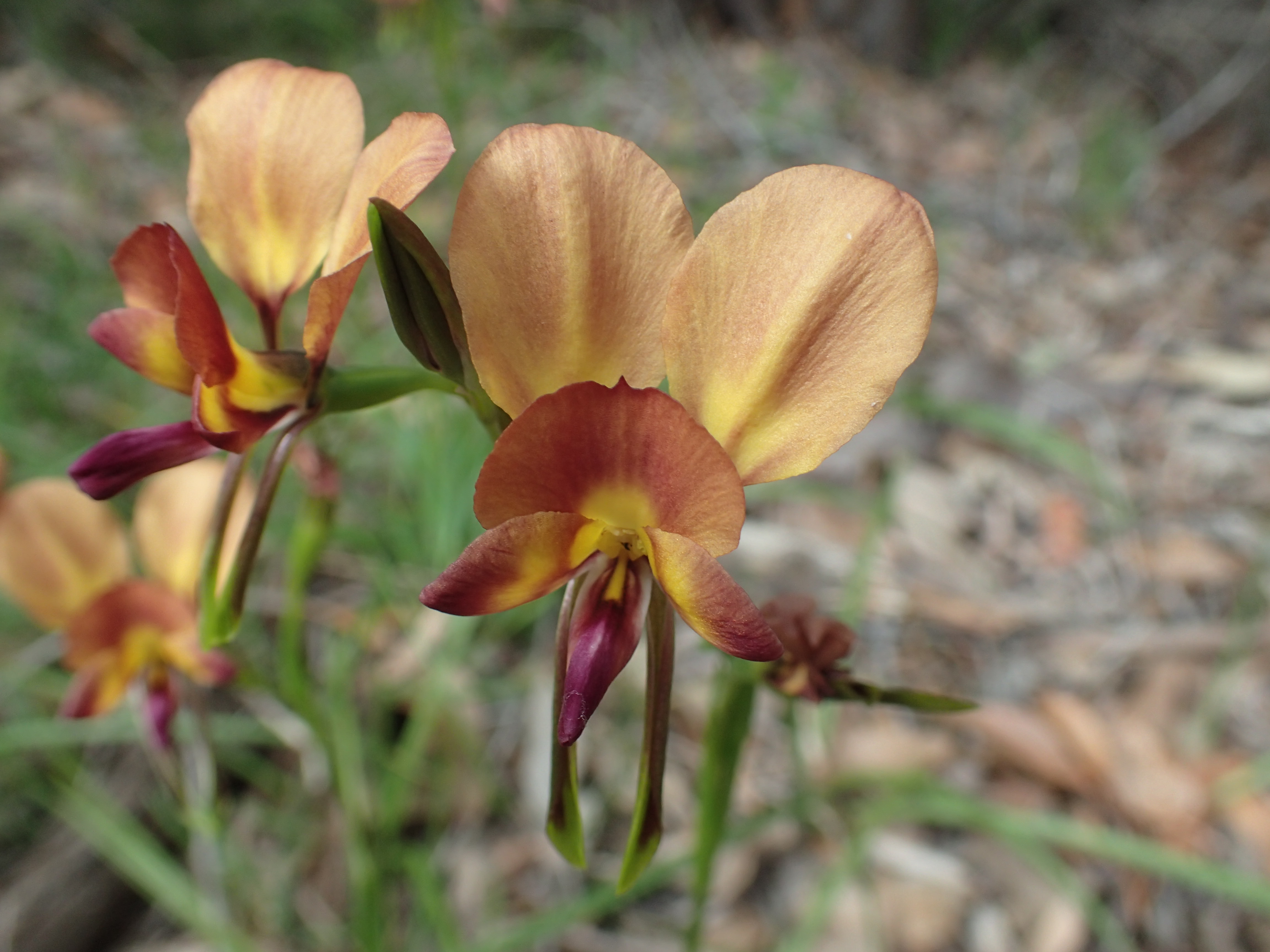
- Near Ellen Brook Road in the Leeuwin-Naturaliste National Park

Scientific classification
- Kingdom: Plantae
- Clade: Embryophytes
- Clade: Tracheophytes
- Clade: Angiosperms
- Clade: Monocots
- Order: Asparagales
- Family: Orchidaceae
- Subfamily: Orchidoideae
- Tribe: Diurideae
- Genus: Diuris
- Species: D. jonesii

Binomial name
- Diuris jonesii C.J.French & G.Brockman

= Diuris jonesii =

Dunsborough donkey orchid

Species of orchid

Diuris jonesii, commonly known as Dunsborough donkey orchid, is a species of orchid that is endemic to the south-west of Western Australia. It has large, yellow, brown and mauve flowers and is found in near-coastal areas between Dunsborough and Augusta.

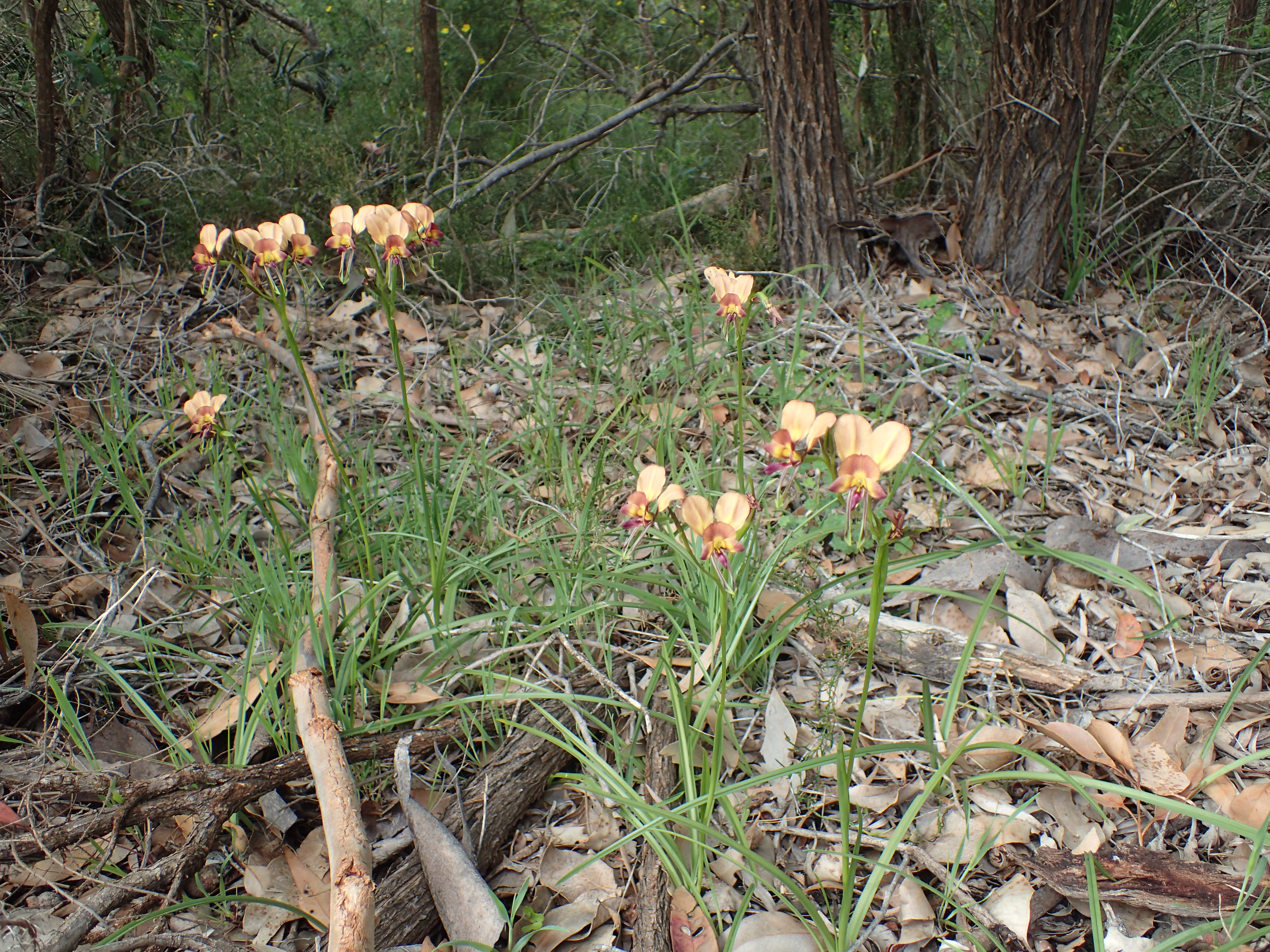
Clumps of Diuris jonesii

== Description ==
Diuris jonesii is a tuberous, perennial herb, usually growing to a height of 250–400 mm (10–20 in). Two or three leaves emerge at the base, each leaf 100–300 mm (4–10 in) long and 5–12 mm (0.2–0.5 in) wide. There are between two and eight yellow, mauve and brown flowers 40–50 mm (1.6–2.0 in) long and 20–35 mm (0.8–1 in) wide. The dorsal sepal is erect and the lateral sepals are narrow and hang downwards or sometimes cross each other. The petals are elongated and the labellum has spreading lateral lobes and a broad, flattened or folded centre lobe. The species is similar to the giant donkey orchid, D. amplissima but has smaller, less colourful flowers and a more coastal distribution. Flowering occurs from late September to October.

== Taxonomy and naming ==
Diuris jonesii was first formally described in 2013 by Christopher French and Garry Brockman from a specimen collected at Cape Naturaliste and the description was published in Australian Orchid Review. The specific epithet (jonesii) honours David Jones.

== Distribution and habitat ==
The Dunsborough donkey orchid grows in shrubland and woodland in near-coastal areas between Dunsborough and Augusta in the Jarrah Forest, Swan Coastal Plain and Warren biogeographic regions.

== Conservation ==
Diuris magnifica is classified as "not threatened" by the Western Australian Government Department of Parks and Wildlife.
