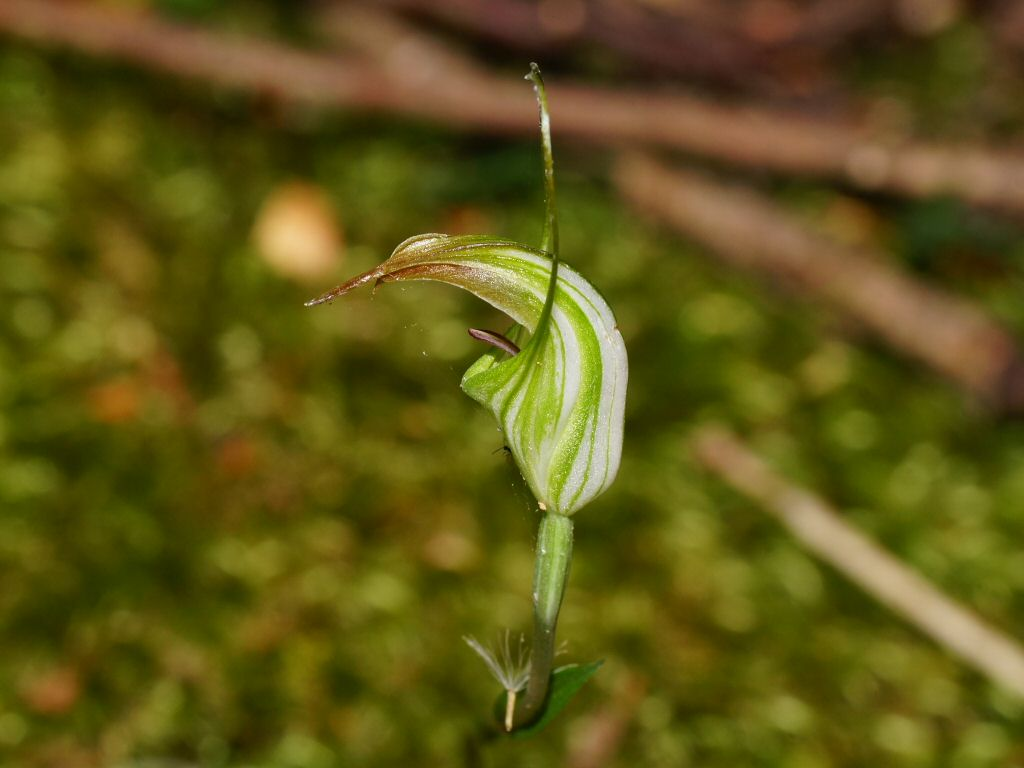
- Pterostylis decurva growing near the Meander River in Tasmania

Scientific classification
- Kingdom: Plantae
- Clade: Tracheophytes
- Clade: Angiosperms
- Clade: Monocots
- Order: Asparagales
- Family: Orchidaceae
- Subfamily: Orchidoideae
- Tribe: Cranichideae
- Genus: Pterostylis
- Species: P. decurva

Binomial name
- Pterostylis decurva R.S.Rogers

Synonyms
- Diplodium decurvum (R.S.Rogers) D.L.Jones & M.A.Clem.

= Pterostylis decurva =

Summer greenhood

Species of orchid

Pterostylis decurva, commonly known as the summer greenhood, is a species of orchid endemic to south-eastern Australia. As with similar greenhoods, the flowering plants differ from those which are not flowering. The non-flowering plants have a rosette of leaves but the flowering plants have a single flower with leaves on the flowering spike. This greenhood usually flowers in summer and has a white flower with green stripes and a brownish tinge. It is similar to P. aestiva but has paler green flowers.

== Description ==
Pterostylis decurva is a terrestrial, perennial, deciduous, herb with an underground tuber and when not flowering, a rosette of two to five leaves often held above the ground on a stalk up to 100 mm long. Each leaf is oblong to egg-shaped, 10–30 mm long and 10–20 mm wide. Flowering plants have a single flower 18–25 mm long and 7–9 mm wide borne on a spike 150–300 mm high with four or five stem leaves. The flowers are white with green stripes and a brown tinge in the galea. The dorsal sepal and petals are fused, forming a hood or "galea" over the column. The dorsal sepal curves forward, often downwards, with a thread-like tip 15–20 mm long. The lateral sepals are held closely against the galea, have an erect, thread-like tip 30–40 mm long and a broad, slightly protruding, U-shaped sinus between their bases. The labellum is 12–15 mm long, 2.5 mm wide, brown, blunt, and curved and protrudes above the sinus. Flowering occurs from October to March.

== Taxonomy and naming ==
Pterostylis decurva was first formally described in 1923 by Richard Sanders Rogers and the description was published in Transactions and Proceedings of the Royal Society of South Australia. The specific epithet (decurva) is a Latin word meaning "curved or bent downwards".

== Distribution and habitat ==
The summer greenhood grows on the higher parts of the ranges and tablelands of Victoria, New South Wales south from Werrikimbe National Park and Tasmania where it sometimes also grows at lower altitudes.
