= Orthoceras (disambiguation) =

Orthoceras may refer to:

- Orthoceras, an extinct cephalopod genus
- Orthoceras (plant), an orchid genus
