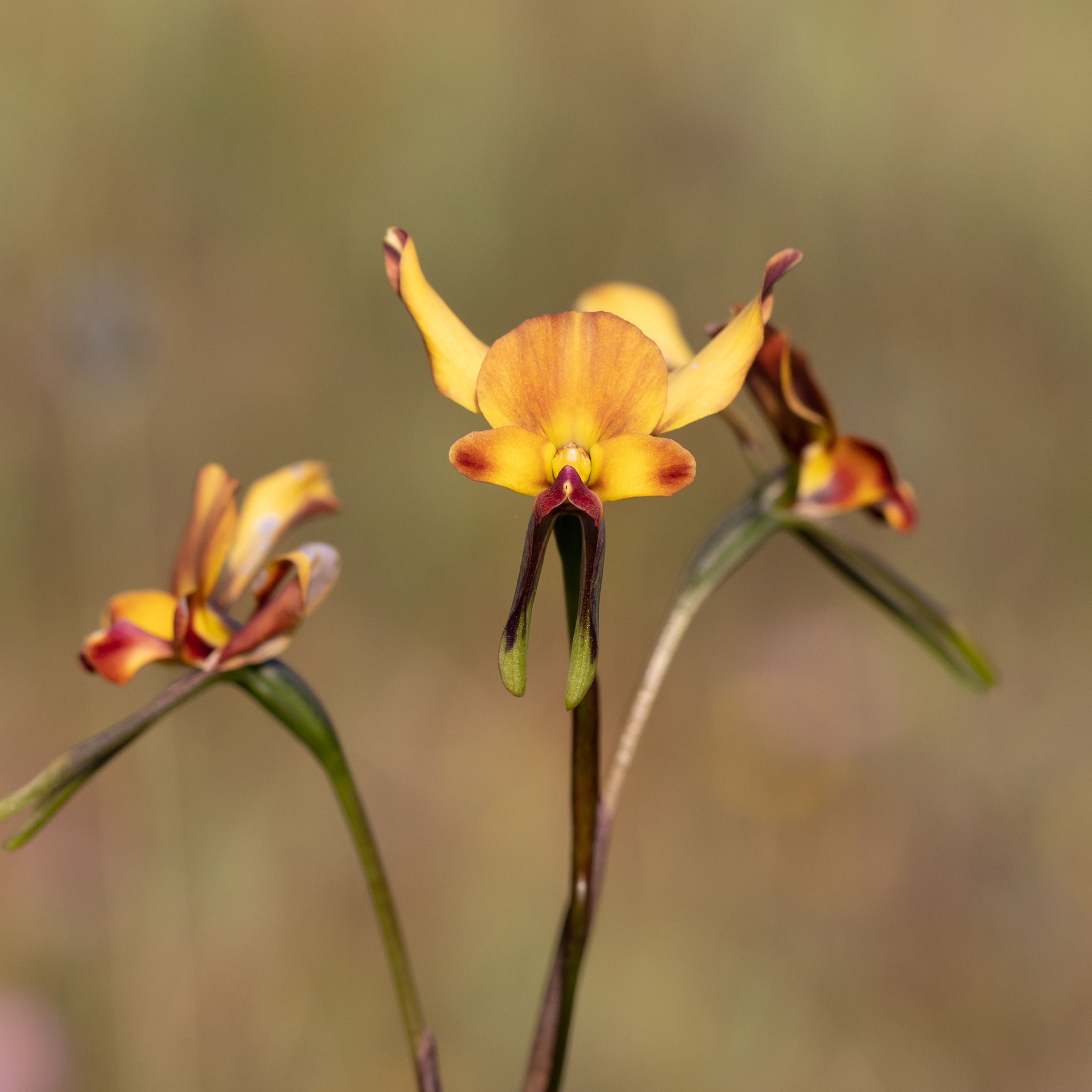
- Diuris brachyscapa near the Stirling Range National Park

Scientific classification
- Kingdom: Plantae
- Clade: Tracheophytes
- Clade: Angiosperms
- Clade: Monocots
- Order: Asparagales
- Family: Orchidaceae
- Subfamily: Orchidoideae
- Tribe: Diurideae
- Genus: Diuris
- Species: D. brachyscapa

Binomial name
- Diuris brachyscapa D.L.Jones & C.J.French

= Diuris brachyscapa =

Western wheatbelt donkey orchid

Species of orchid

Diuris brachyscapa, commonly known as western wheatbelt donkey orchid, is a species of orchid that is endemic to the south-west of Western Australia. It has two or three linear leaves and a flowering stem with up to four pale yellow flowers with brown markings.

== Description ==
Diuris brachyscapa is a tuberous, perennial herb, usually growing to a height of 150–300 mm (5.9–11.8 in) with two or three linear leaves 120–250 mm (4.7–9.8 in) long and 8–12 mm (0.31–0.47 in) wide. There are up to four pale yellow flowers with brown markings, 20–30 mm (0.79–1.18 in) wide. The flowers have erect, ear-like petals 13–20 mm (0.51–0.79 in) long, an egg-shaped dorsal sepal 4–8 mm (0.16–0.31 in) long and 7–11 mm (0.28–0.43 in) wide, and narrowly oblong lateral sepals 11–18 mm (0.43–0.71 in) long. The labellum has three lobes, the lateral ones broad and spreading, and the middle lobe broad and flattened to convex with a yellow callus. Flowering occurs from late July to September.

This donkey orchid is similar to (D. corymbosa) but is shorter and has fewer and smaller flowers.

== Taxonomy and naming ==
Diuris brachyscapa was first formally described in 2016 by David Jones and Christopher French in Australian Orchid Review from specimens collected by French near Kweda in 1996. The specific epithet (brachyscapa) means "short stem", referring to the short habit of this species compared to D. corymbosa.

== Distribution and habitat ==
Western wheatbelt donkey orchid grows in woodland, and on and around granite outcrops between the Albany and Great Eastern Highways, Katanning and Ravensthorpe in the Avon Wheatbelt, Esperance Plains, Jarrah Forest and Mallee bioregions of south-western Western Australia.

== Conservation ==
Diuris brachyscapa is classified as "not threatened" by the Western Australian Government Department of Biodiversity, Conservation and Attractions.
