= Laughing leek orchid =

Laughing leek orchid may refer to:

- Prasophyllum macrostachyum, endemic to Western Australia
- Prasophyllum gracile - as the little laughing leek orchid
