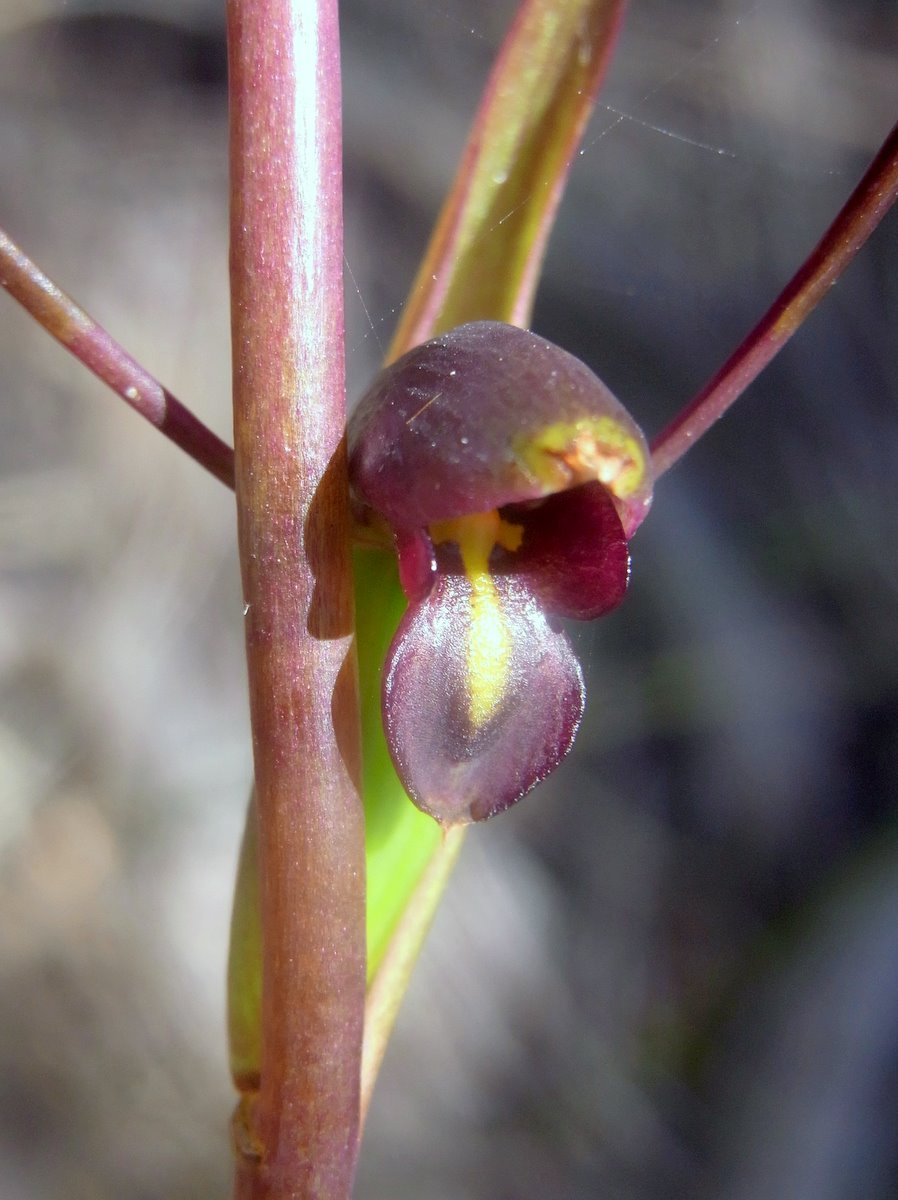
- In Ku-ring-gai Chase National Park, Australia

Scientific classification
- Kingdom: Plantae
- Clade: Tracheophytes
- Clade: Angiosperms
- Clade: Monocots
- Order: Asparagales
- Family: Orchidaceae
- Subfamily: Orchidoideae
- Tribe: Diurideae
- Genus: Orthoceras
- Species: O. strictum

Binomial name
- Orthoceras strictum R.Br.

Synonyms
- Orthoceras sp. aff. strictum

= Orthoceras strictum =

Bird's-mouth orchid

Species of orchid

Orthoceras strictum, commonly known as the bird's-mouth orchid or horned orchid, is a species of orchid native to eastern and southern Australia, New Zealand and New Caledonia. It has between two and five linear leaves and up to nine yellowish green, brownish or blackish flowers with two long, erect to spreading lateral sepals.

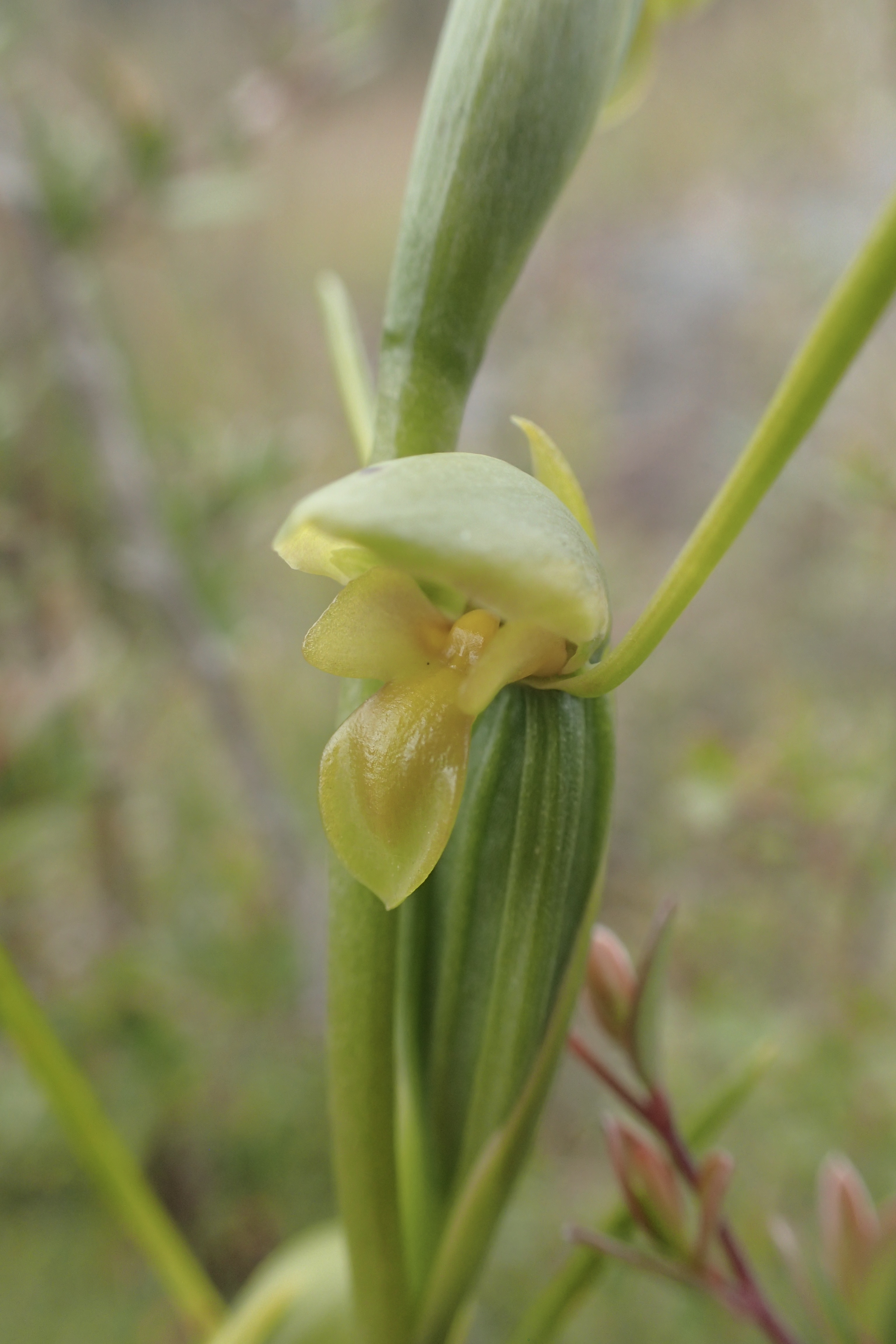
Yellowish green form in Cathedral Rock National Park

== Description ==
Orthoceras strictum is a terrestrial, perennial, deciduous, herb with an underground tuber and a tuft of between two and five linear to thread-like, grass-like leaves, 150–300 mm (6–10 in) long and 2–3 mm (0.08–0.1 in) wide. Up to nine flowers 8–10 mm (0.3–0.4 in) wide are borne on a rigid flowering stem 300–600 mm (10–20 in) tall. Flower colour varies from blackish, brownish, maroon to yellowish green. The dorsal sepal is egg-shaped and forms a hood over the rest of the flower, 9–12 mm (0.4–0.5 in) long and 8–10 mm (0.3–0.4 in) wide. The lateral sepals are linear, horn-like, 20–25 mm (0.8–1 in) long, about 1 mm (0.04 in) wide and erect, spreading or curved. The petals are oblong, 8–10 mm (0.3–0.4 in) long, about 3 mm (0.1 in) wide and hidden inside the dorsal sepal. The labellum is 6–10 mm (0.2–0.4 in) long and has three lobes. The middle lobe is elliptic to egg-shaped, 6–7 mm (0.2–0.3 in) long, 5–6 mm (0.20–0.24 in) wide and the side lobes are 5–6 mm (0.20–0.24 in) long, about 1.5 mm (0.06 in) wide. There is a pyramid-shaped callus near the base of the labellum. Flowering occurs from November to February.

== Taxonomy and naming ==
Orthoceras strictum was first formally described in 1810 by Robert Brown and the description was published in his book Prodromus Florae Novae Hollandiae et Insulae Van Diemen. The generic name (Orthoceras) is derived from the Ancient Greek words orthos meaning "straight" and keras, keratos meaning "horn, which alludes to the upright lateral sepals. The specific epithet (strictum) is a Latin word meaning "straight" or "tight".

== Distribution and habitat ==
The bird's-mouth orchid is widespread but uncommon and occurs in New South Wales, Queensland, South Australia, Tasmania, Victoria and New Caledonia. It grows in a wide range of habitats from grassy forest to heath. The differences between this species and Orthoceras novae-zeelandiae from New Zealand are "very slight and dubious".

== Conservation ==
Orthoceras strictum is listed in Tasmania as "rare" under the Tasmanian Government Threatened Species Protection Act 1995.
