= Diuris amplissima =

Giant donkey orchid

Scientific classification
- Kingdom: Plantae
- Clade: Tracheophytes
- Clade: Angiosperms
- Clade: Monocots
- Order: Asparagales
- Family: Orchidaceae
- Subfamily: Orchidoideae
- Tribe: Diurideae
- Genus: Diuris
- Species: D. amplissima

Binomial name
- Diuris amplissima D.L.Jones

Species of orchid

Diuris amplissima, commonly known as giant donkey orchid, is a species of orchid that is endemic to the south-west of Western Australia. It is a rare species and the largest Diuris in Western Australia. It has two or three leaves at its base and up to seven purple and dull yellowish-brown flowers on a tall flowering stem.

== Description ==
Diuris amplissima is a tuberous, perennial herb, usually growing to a height of 400–900 mm (20–40 in) with two or three leaves emerging at the base, each leaf 100–220 mm (4–9 in) long and 10–20 mm (0.4–0.8 in) wide. There are between three and seven purple and dull yellowish-brown flowers 40–60 mm (1.6–2.4 in) long and 35–45 mm (1–2 in) wide. The dorsal sepal is erect, 12–15 mm (0.5–0.6 in) long and 16–23 mm (0.6–0.9 in) wide and oval to kidney-shaped (wider than long). The lateral sepals are linear to sword-shaped, green with purplish marks, 18–28 mm (0.7–1 in) long, 3–4.5 mm (0.1–0.2 in) wide, turned downwards and usually parallel to each other. The petals are more or less erect with an elliptic to oval blade 18–30 mm (0.7–1 in) long and 12–15 mm (0.5–0.6 in) wide on a purplish-brown stalk 5–7 mm (0.2–0.3 in) long. The labellum is 12–16 mm (0.5–0.6 in) long and has three lobes. The centre lobe is wedge-shaped, 10–14 mm (0.4–0.6 in) long, 10–12 mm (0.4–0.5 in) wide and the side lobes are asymmetric egg-shaped, 10–15 mm (0.4–0.6 in) long and 5–8 mm (0.2–0.3 in) wide with wavy or crinkled edges. There is a ridge-like callus 2–3 mm (0.08–0.1 in) in the mid-line of the base of the labellum. Flowering occurs from September to November.

== Taxonomy and naming ==
Diuris amplissima was first formally described in 1991 by David Jones from a specimen collected near Moodiarrup, and the description was published in Australian Orchid Review. The specific epithet (amplissima) is a Latin word meaning "largest", referring to the "impressive flowers".

== Distribution and habitat ==
Giant donkey orchid grows in woodland and forest between Porongurup and Capel in the Avon Wheatbelt, Jarrah Forest and Mallee biogeographic regions. It is a rare species, similar to D. magnifica but grows in heavier soils than the sandy habitat of that species.

== Conservation ==
Diuris amplissima is classified as "not threatened" by the Western Australian Government Department of Biodiversity, Conservation and Attractions.
