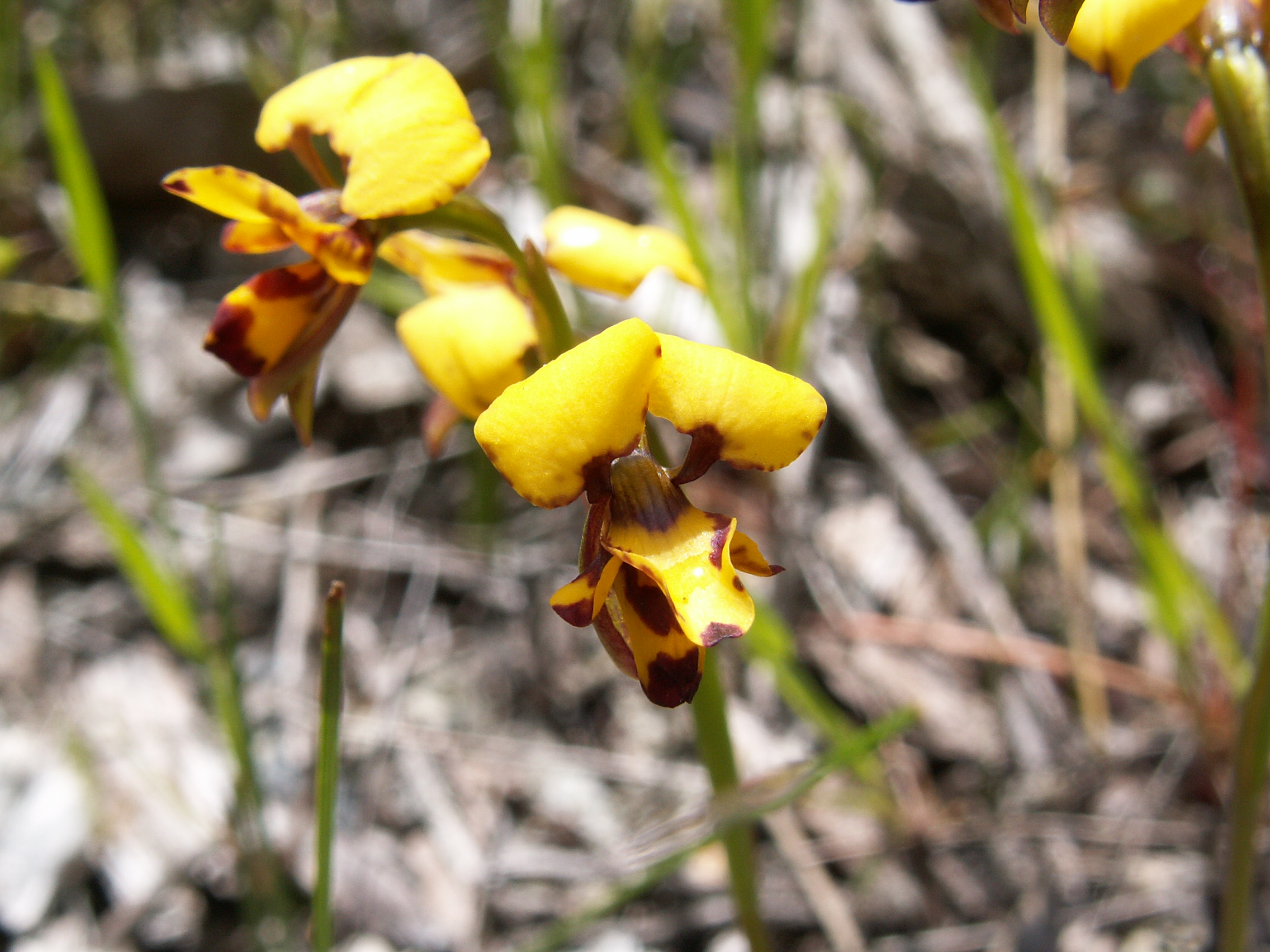
- In Cranbrook

Scientific classification
- Kingdom: Plantae
- Clade: Tracheophytes
- Clade: Angiosperms
- Clade: Monocots
- Order: Asparagales
- Family: Orchidaceae
- Subfamily: Orchidoideae
- Tribe: Diurideae
- Genus: Diuris
- Species: D. laxiflora

Binomial name
- Diuris laxiflora Lindl.

= Diuris laxiflora =

Bee orchid

Species of orchid

Diuris laxiflora, commonly known as bee orchid, is a species of orchid which is endemic to the southwest of Western Australia. It has two to five narrowly linear leaves and up to six yellow flowers with brown markings. It is a small orchid, common within its range and about half the size of the common donkey orchid, Diuris corymbosa.

== Description ==
Diuris laxiflora is a tuberous, perennial herb with two to five narrowly linear leaves 150–300 mm (5.9–11.8 in) long and 2.0–3.5 mm (0.079–0.138 in) wide. Up to five yellow flowers with brown markings, 25–35 mm (0.98–1.38 in) long and 20–25 mm (0.79–0.98 in) wide are borne on a flowering stem 300–800 mm (12–31 in) tall. The dorsal sepal is narrowly egg-shaped, 7–13 mm (0.28–0.51 in) long and 5.5–8 mm (0.22–0.31 in) wide, the lateral sepals parallel or crossed, 10–14 mm (0.39–0.55 in) long and 2.0–3.5 mm (0.079–0.138 in) wide. The petals are elliptic to egg-shaped or almost round, 7–12 mm (0.28–0.47 in) long and 6–10 mm (0.24–0.39 in) wide on a stalk 3–5 mm (0.12–0.20 in) long. The labellum is 8–12 mm (0.31–0.47 in) long with three lobes - the centre lobe broadly wedge-shaped, 7–11 mm (0.28–0.43 in) long and 8–12 mm (0.31–0.47 in) wide, the side lobes spread widely apart and oblong, 4–7 mm (0.16–0.28 in) long, 2–3 mm (0.079–0.118 in) wide and with a prominent red blotch at the base. There is are two calli outlined with red either side of the mid-line of the labellum. Flowering occurs from September to early November.

== Taxonomy and naming ==
Diuris laxiflora first described by John Lindley in 1839 and published in his "A Sketch of the Vegetation of the Swan River Colony" (1840). In The Genera and Species of Orchidaceous Plants he wrote "The pedicels and ovary together are about 3 inches long, which is less than the length of the internodes. Each stem bears from 4 to 8 flowers, which seem to be dark yellow, with no spotting, but perhaps with some stains of purple."

The specific epithet (laxiflora) means "open-flowered".

== Distribution and habitat ==
Bee orchid is endemic to the south western corner of Western Australia, occurring in the Avon Wheatbelt, Esperance, Geraldton Sandplains, Jarrah Forest, Mallee, Swan Coastal Plain and Warren biogeographical regions of Western Australia. It grows in sand, lateritic loam, clay and granite rock margins in winter-wet swamps.
