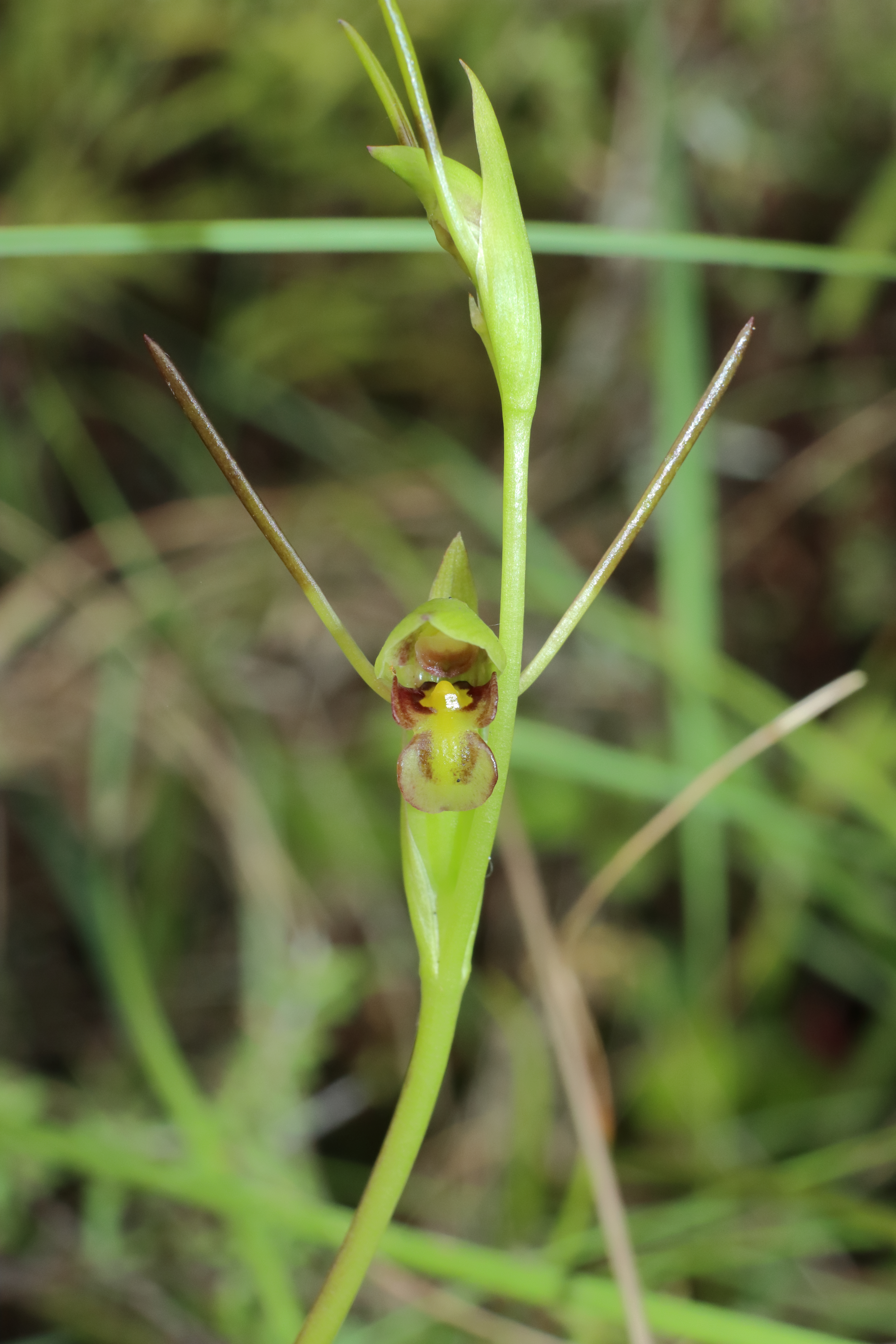
- In Turitea, Palmerston North, New Zealand

Scientific classification
- Kingdom: Plantae
- Clade: Tracheophytes
- Clade: Angiosperms
- Clade: Monocots
- Order: Asparagales
- Family: Orchidaceae
- Subfamily: Orchidoideae
- Tribe: Diurideae
- Genus: Orthoceras
- Species: O. novae-zeelandiae

Binomial name
- Orthoceras novae-zeelandiae (A.Rich.) M.A.Clem., D.L.Jones & Molloy 1989

= Orthoceras novae-zeelandiae =

Species of orchid

Orthoceras novae-zeelandiae, commonly known as the New Zealand horned orchid, is a species of orchid native to New Zealand. In Māori it is called hūperei or perei.

== Description ==
Orthoceras novae-zeelandiae is a terrestrial, perennial, tuberous, herb. Flowering occurs from December to March.

== Taxonomy and naming ==
It was first described in 1989 by Mark Alwin Clements, David L. Jones, and Brian Molloy.

== Distribution and habitat ==
Orthoceras novae-zeelandiae is found in the North and South Island of New Zealand. It ranges from coastal to montane environments (up to 800 meters)
