= Myrmecia urens =

Scientific classification
- Kingdom: Animalia
- Phylum: Arthropoda
- Class: Insecta
- Order: Hymenoptera
- Family: Formicidae
- Subfamily: Myrmeciinae
- Genus: Myrmecia
- Species: M. urens

Binomial name
- Myrmecia urens Lowne, 1865

Species of ant

Myrmecia urens is a species of ant in the genus Myrmecia (bulldog ants) found in Australia.

== Behaviour and ecology ==
While pollination by ants is somewhat rare, the orchid Leporella fimbriata is a myrmecophyte which can only be pollinated by the winged males of this species. Pollination of this orchid usually occurs between April and June during warm afternoons, and may take several days until the males all die due to their limited lifespan. The flower mimics M. urens queens, and so the males move from flower to flower in an attempt to copulate with it.
