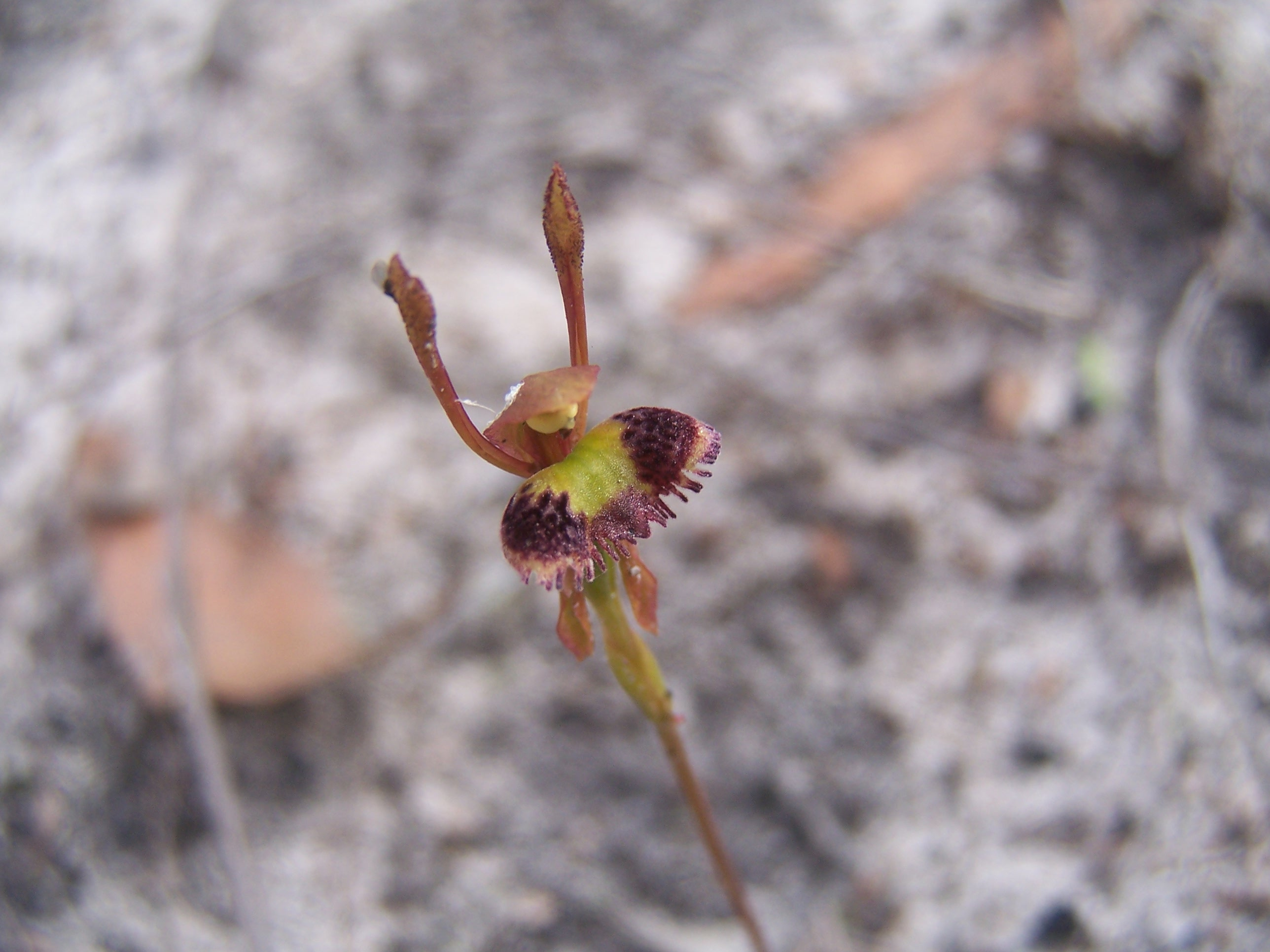

Scientific classification
- Kingdom: Plantae
- Clade: Tracheophytes
- Clade: Angiosperms
- Clade: Monocots
- Order: Asparagales
- Family: Orchidaceae
- Subfamily: Orchidoideae
- Tribe: Diurideae
- Subtribe: Megastylidinae
- Genus: Leporella; A.S.George
- Species: L. fimbriata

Binomial name
- Leporella fimbriata (Lindl.) A.S.George

Synonyms
- Caladenia fimbriata (Lindl.) Rchb.f.; Caladenia fimbriata (Lindl.) Rchb.f. var. fimbriata; Caladenia fimbriata var. pectinata (Lindl.) Rchb.f.; Eriochilus fimbriatus (Lindl.) F.Muell.; Leptoceras fimbriata Lindl.; Leptoceras fimbriatum J.M.Black orth. var.; Leptoceras pectinata Lindl.; Leptoceras pectinatum Rupp orth. var.

= Leporella =

Fringed hare orchid

Genus of orchids

Leporella fimbriata, commonly known as hare orchid or fringed hare orchid, is the only species in the flowering plant genus Leporella in the orchid family, Orchidaceae and is endemic to the southern Australia mainland. It is related to orchids in the genus Caladenia but has an unusual labellum and does not have hairy leaves. Its pollination mechanism is also unusual.

== Description ==
Leporella fimbriata is a terrestrial, perennial, deciduous, sympodial herb with a few inconspicuous, fine roots and an oval-shaped tuber lacking a protective sheath. The tuber produces two "droppers" which become the daughter tubers in the following year. Unlike those in some other orchids, the droppers are produced well away from the parent tuber at the end of long, root-like stolons. There are one or two egg-shaped to lance-shaped, glabrous leaves at the base of the stem. The leaves are often small when the orchid flowers, but increase in size to 40 mm (2 in) long and 20 mm (0.8 in) wide, turning bluish-green with reddish veins as they mature.

There are up to three resupinate flowers on the end of a wiry stem 10–25 cm (4–10 in) high. The flowers are 1–3 cm (0.4–1 in) long and 1 cm (0.4 in) wide. The dorsal sepal is dished, 8–10 mm (0.3–0.4 in) long and curves over the labellum. The two lateral sepals are about the same length but very narrow and turned back against the ovary. As is usual in orchids, one petal is highly modified as the central labellum. The other two petals are erect, 10–12 mm (0.4–0.5 in) long, narrow, linear in shape but with a club-like end which has many glandular hairs. The labellum is about 5 mm (0.2 in) long and 10 mm (0.4 in) wide, hairy and greenish with reddish-brown spots and a comb-like fringe. There are no obvious calli on the labellum. The sexual parts of the flower are fused to the column, which has wing-like structures on its sides. Flowering occurs from March to June but the remains of the flower are often recognisable as late as September. The fruit is a non-fleshy, glabrous, dehiscent capsule containing a large number of seeds.

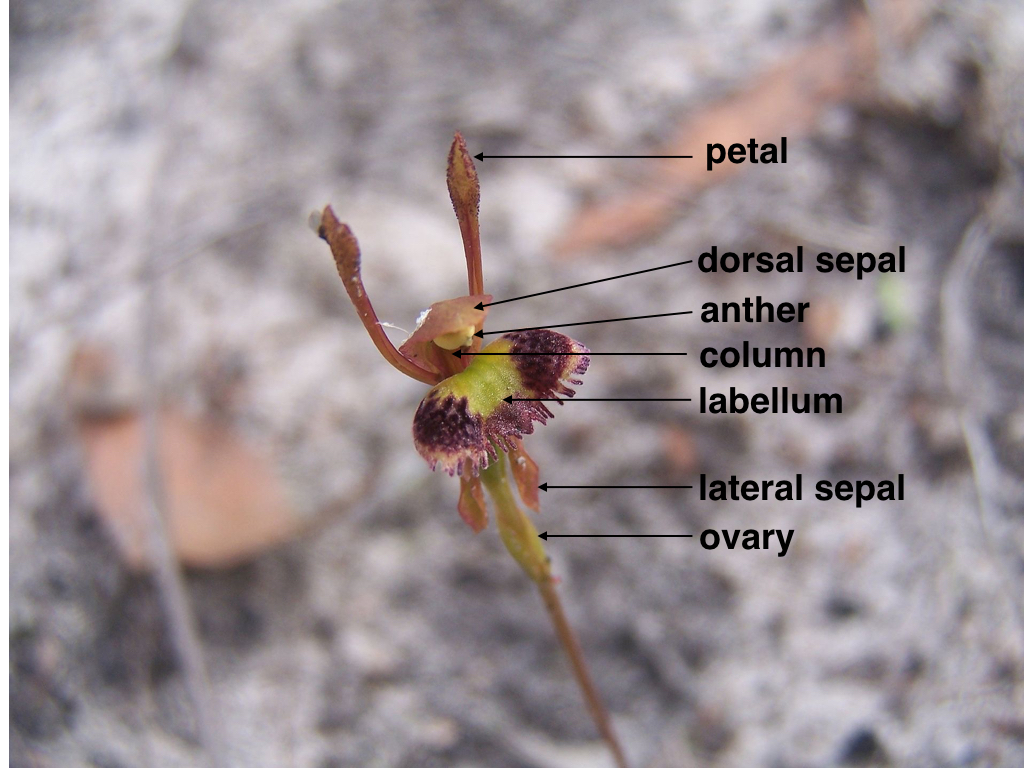
Labelled image

== Taxonomy and naming ==
This orchid was first formally described in 1840 by John Lindley who gave it the name Leptoceras fimbriata and published the description in A Sketch of the Vegetation of the Swan River Colony. In 1971, Alex George described the genus Leporella and included this species.

The genus name "Leporella" is derived from the Latin word lepus meaning "hare" with the diminutive suffix meaning -ella, hence "leporella" meaning "little hare". The specific epithet "fimbriata" is a Latin word meaning "fringed".

== Distribution and habitat ==
Leporella fimbriata usually grows in woodland or shrubland but is also found in heath and near areas that are swampy in winter. It is found in the western half of Victoria, and across southern South Australia to southern Western Australia. In Western Australia it occurs between Shark Bay in the north and Israelite Bay on the south coast. In South Australia, in the south-east, especially the Yorke Peninsula and Eyre Peninsula, and in the south-west of Victoria, including the Anglesea area and outer Melbourne suburbs.

== Ecology ==
This orchid is a myrmecophyte and is pollinated by a male bull-ant (Myrmecia urens, Family Formicidae) when the ant attempts to copulate with the labellum.

== See also ==
- List of Orchidaceae genera
- List of the orchids of Western Australia
