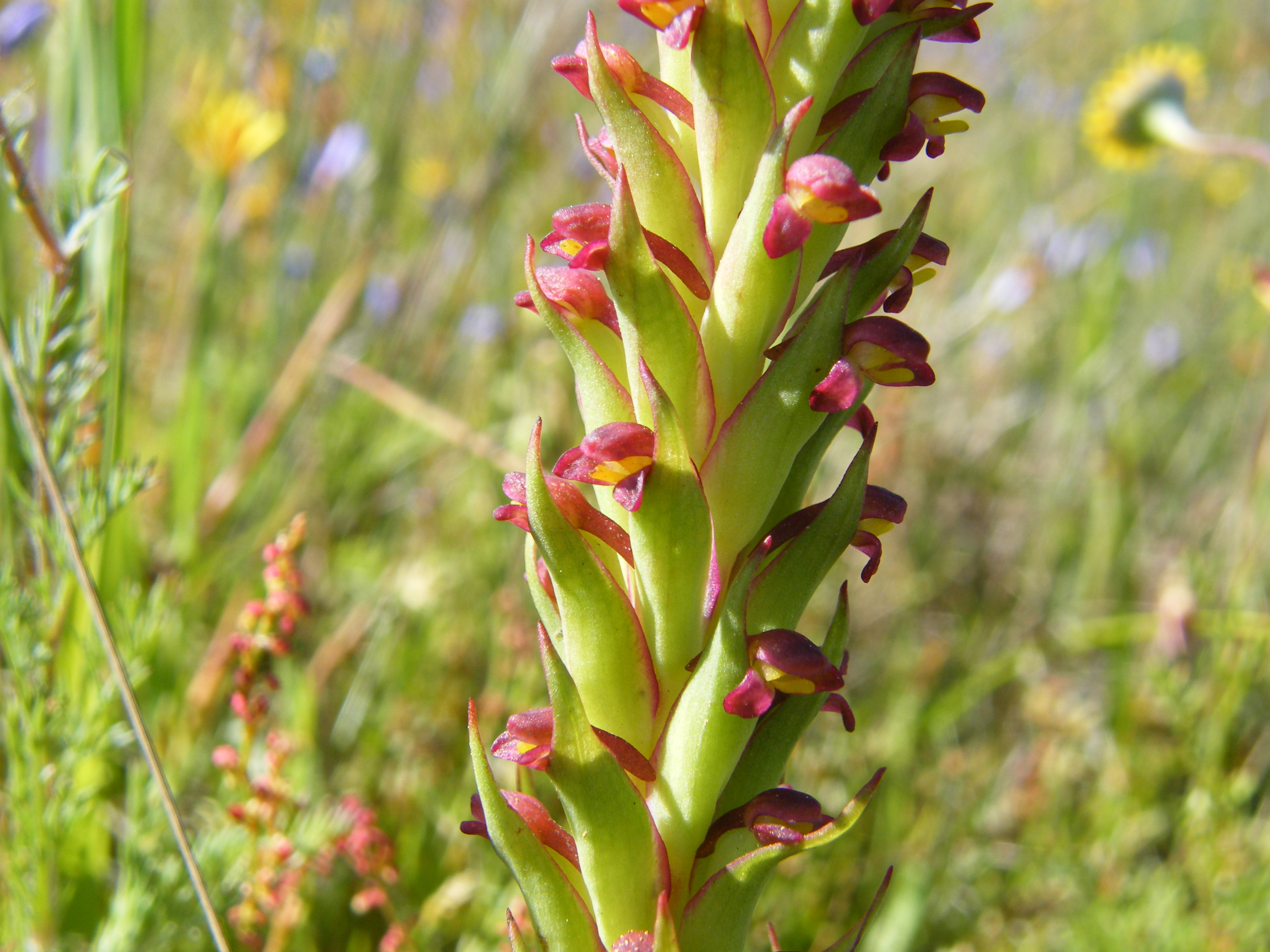

Scientific classification
- Kingdom: Plantae
- Clade: Tracheophytes
- Clade: Angiosperms
- Clade: Monocots
- Order: Asparagales
- Family: Orchidaceae
- Subfamily: Orchidoideae
- Genus: Disa
- Species: D. bracteata

Binomial name
- Disa bracteata Sw.

Synonyms
- Disa micrantha (Lindl.) Bolus; Disa praetermissa Schltr.; Monadenia australiensis Rupp; Monadenia bracteata (Sw.) T.Durand & Schinz; Monadenia micrantha Lindl.; Monadenia praetermissa Schltr.

= Disa bracteata =

South African plant species in the orchid family

Disa bracteata, also known as the bract disa, leek orchid or the South African weed orchid is a species of orchid native to South Africa.

== Description ==
This tuberous geophyte that typically grows up to 30 cm (12 in) tall, although there are records of taller specimens. The linear-lanceolate leaves are 4–12 cm (1.6–4.7 in) long. They have a rounded base and sharply pointed tips.

Flowers are present between September and November. They grow in a many flowered cylindrical inflorescence that is 2–12 cm (0.79–4.72 in) long. The bracts are slightly longer than the flowers themselves. The flowers are bi-coloured with greenish-yellow lower sections and helmet-shaped maroon upper sections. The helmet-shaped sepals are 2.5–4.5 mm (0.098–0.177 in) long. The shallowly triangular spur is 3–4.5 mm (0.12–0.18 in) long. The pendent lip has an oblong to oblanceolate shape. The anther is also pendent and has a large notch in the rostellum.

== Distribution and habitat ==
This species is endemic to South Africa, where it is found in the Western Cape and Eastern Cape. It is found from sea level to an altitude of 2,000 m (6,600 ft) in Fynbos, Renosterveld and Albany Thicket habitats. It does particularly well in disturbed habitats, such as roadsides, where it is more common and occurs in higher densities than in undisturbed sites.

Disa bracteata is invasive in Australia. It is one of the few orchid species which has become naturalized in Australia. It was first recorded in Western Australia in 1944, in South Australia in 1988, and Victoria in 1994. There is also a single recording in Tasmania. At sites where D. bracteata has invaded, there have been up to 80 individuals found per square metre in the area. The similarity of environmental conditions in Australia and South Africa has allowed D. bracteata, as well as many other species native to South Africa, to become naturalised in various parts of Australia.

== Ecology ==
This species is known to be capable of self pollination.

== Conservation ==
This species is considered to be of least concern by the South African National Biodiversity Institute (SANBI).
