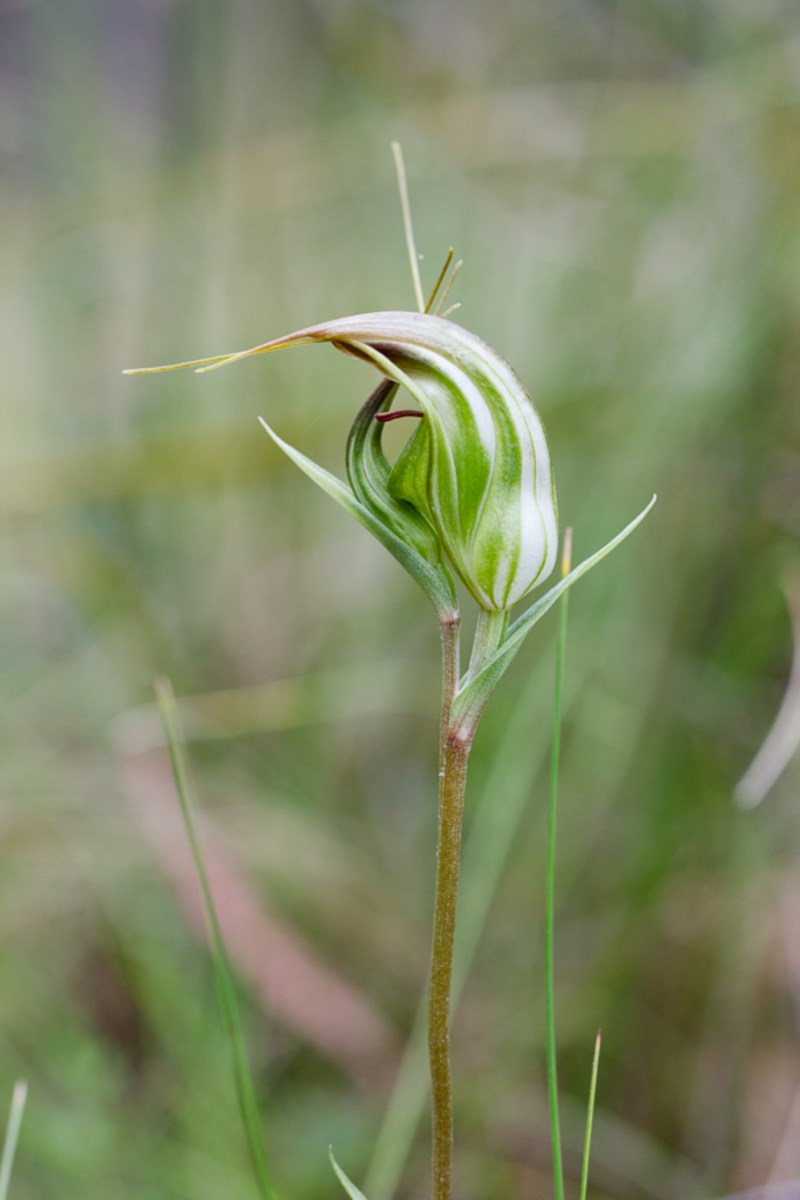
- Pterostylis aestiva growing in Namadgi National Park

Scientific classification
- Kingdom: Plantae
- Clade: Tracheophytes
- Clade: Angiosperms
- Clade: Monocots
- Order: Asparagales
- Family: Orchidaceae
- Subfamily: Orchidoideae
- Tribe: Cranichideae
- Genus: Pterostylis
- Species: P. aestiva

Binomial name
- Pterostylis aestiva D.L.Jones

Synonyms
- Diplodium aestivum (D.L.Jones) D.L.Jones & M.A.Clem.

= Pterostylis aestiva =

Long-tongued summer greenhood

Species of orchid

Pterostylis aestiva, commonly known as the long-tongued summer greenhood, is a species of orchid endemic to south-eastern Australia. As with similar greenhoods, the flowering plants differ from those which are not flowering. The non-flowering plants have a rosette of leaves flat on the ground but the flowering plants have a single flower with leaves on the flowering spike.

== Description ==
Pterostylis aestiva is a terrestrial, perennial, deciduous, herb with an underground tuber and when not flowering, a rosette of dark bluish-green leaves, each leaf 10–30 millimetres (0.4–1 in) long and 10–15 millimetres (0.4–0.6 in) wide. Flowering plants have a single flower 20–30 millimetres (0.8–1 in) long and 7–9 millimetres (0.3–0.4 in) wide borne on a spike 150–350 millimetres (6–10 in) high with between three and five stem leaves. The flowers are dark bluish-green, white and brown. The dorsal sepal and petals are fused, forming a hood or "galea" over the column. The dorsal sepal curves forward with a thread-like tip 8–12 millimetres (0.3–0.5 in) long. The lateral sepals are held closely against the galea, have an erect, thread-like tip 25–35 millimetres (0.98–1.4 in) long and a protruding sinus between their bases. The labellum is 15–19 millimetres (0.6–0.7 in) long, about 4 millimetres (0.2 in) wide, brown, blunt, and curved and protrudes above the sinus. Flowering occurs from January to April.

== Taxonomy and naming ==
Pterostylis aestiva was first formally described in 1972 by David Jones from a specimen collected near Wulgulmerang. The description was published in Muelleria. The specific epithet (aestiva) is a Latin word meaning "pertaining to summer".

== Distribution and habitat ==
The long-tongued summer greenhood grows among grasses in high rainfall forests in north-east Victoria and New South Wales as far north as Mount Canobolas.

== Use in horticulture ==
This greenhood is easily grows in pots although plants must be kept moist during the growing season and dry when dormant.
