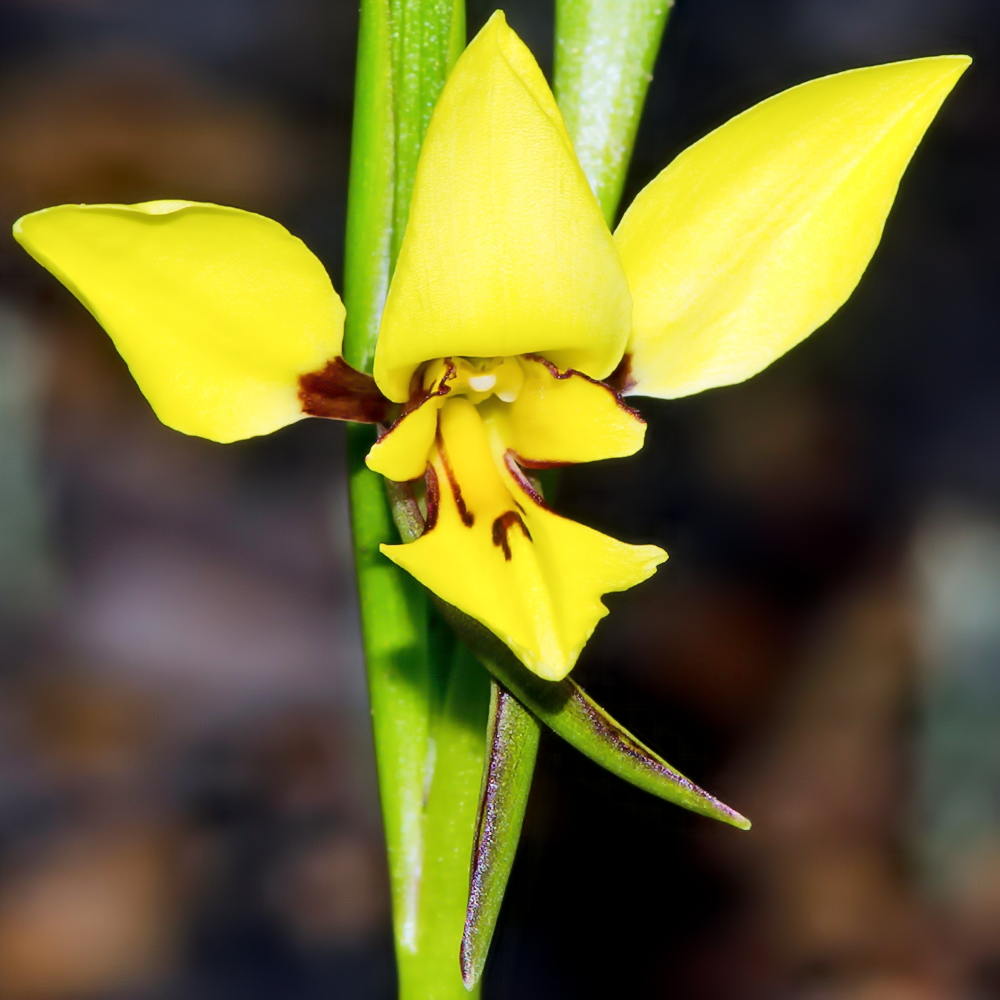

Scientific classification
- Kingdom: Plantae
- Clade: Embryophytes
- Clade: Tracheophytes
- Clade: Angiosperms
- Clade: Monocots
- Order: Asparagales
- Family: Orchidaceae
- Subfamily: Orchidoideae
- Tribe: Diurideae
- Genus: Diuris
- Species: D. setacea

Binomial name
- Diuris setacea R.Br.

Synonyms
- Diuris setacea R.Br. var. setacea; Diuris setacea var. typica Domin nom. inval.

= Diuris setacea =

Bristly donkey orchid

Species of orchid

Diuris setacea, commonly called bristly donkey orchid, is a species of orchid that is endemic to the south-west of Western Australia. It has a tuft of up to ten twisted leaves at its base and up to seven yellow flowers with a few brown markings. It grows in moist soil on granite outcrops and flowers much more prolifically after fire the previous summer.

== Description ==
Diuris setacea is a tuberous, perennial herb with between six and ten spirally twisted leaves in a tuft at its base. The leaves are 50–100 mm (2–4 in) long and 1–2 mm (0.04–0.08 in) wide. Between two and seven yellow flowers with brown markings, 25–30 mm (0.98–1.2 in) long and 20–30 mm (0.8–1 in) wide are borne on a flowering stem 150–300 mm (6–10 in) tall. The dorsal sepal is erect, 13–16 mm (0.5–0.6 in) long and 7–8 mm (0.28–0.31 in) wide. The lateral sepals are 15–18 mm (0.6–0.7 in) long, 2–3 mm (0.08–0.1 in) wide and turned downwards. The petals are more or less erect or bent backwards, 11–14 mm (0.4–0.6 in) long and 6–7 mm (0.24–0.28 in) wide on a greenish brown stalk 3–5 mm (0.12–0.20 in) long. The labellum is 12–14 mm (0.47–0.55 in) long and has three lobes. The centre lobe is diamond-shaped, 6–8 mm (0.2–0.3 in) wide and folded lengthwise. The side lobes are 4–6 mm (0.16–0.24 in) long and 4 mm (0.2 in) wide and spread apart from each other. There are two, ridge-like calli 5–7 mm (0.2–0.3 in) long and outlined in brown along the mid-line of the labellum. Flowering occurs from October to December but much more prolifically after fire the previous summer.

== Taxonomy and naming ==
Diuris setacea was first described in 1810 by Robert Brown and the description was published in his Prodromus Florae Novae Hollandiae et Insulae Van Diemen. The specific epithet (setacea) is derived from the Latin word seta meaning "bristle".

== Distribution and habitat ==
Bristly donkey orchid grows in low heath in moist soil on granite outcrops between Esperance and Kalbarri.

== Conservation ==
Diuris setacea is classified as "not threatened" by the Government of Western Australia Department of Parks and Wildlife.
