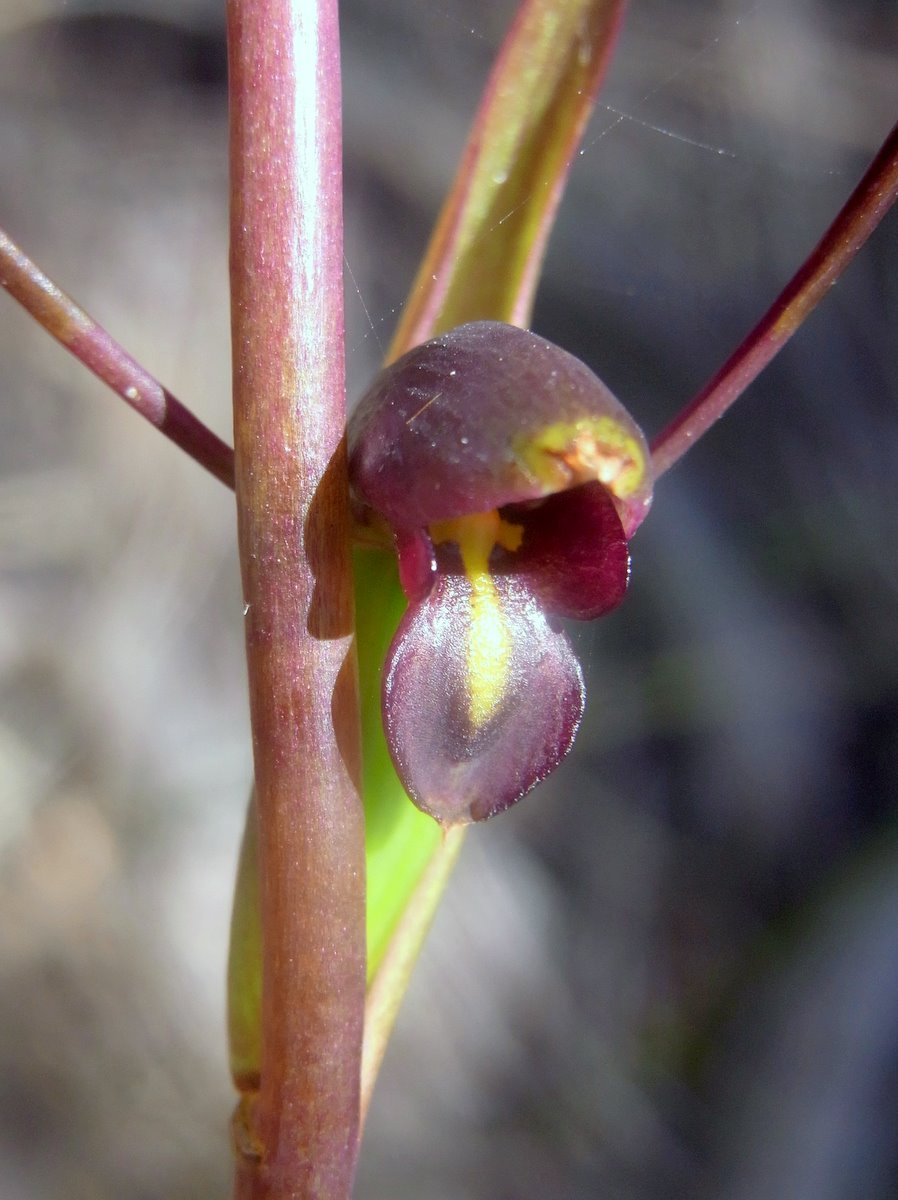
- Orthoceras strictum

Scientific classification
- Kingdom: Plantae
- Clade: Tracheophytes
- Clade: Angiosperms
- Clade: Monocots
- Order: Asparagales
- Family: Orchidaceae
- Subfamily: Orchidoideae
- Tribe: Diurideae
- Subtribe: Diuridinae
- Genus: Orthoceras; R.Br., Prodr. Fl. Nov. Holl.: 316 (1810)

Type species
- Orthoceras strictum R.Br., Prodr. Fl. Nov. Holl.: 317 (1810)

= Orthoceras (plant) =

Genus of orchids

Orthoceras is a genus of orchids native to Australia, New Zealand and New Caledonia. Two species are known:

- Orthoceras novae-zeelandiae (A.Rich.) M.A.Clem., D.L.Jones & Molloy - New Zealand
- Orthoceras strictum R.Br. - New South Wales, Queensland, South Australia, Tasmania, Victoria, New Zealand North Island, New Caledonia

== See also ==
- List of Orchidaceae genera
