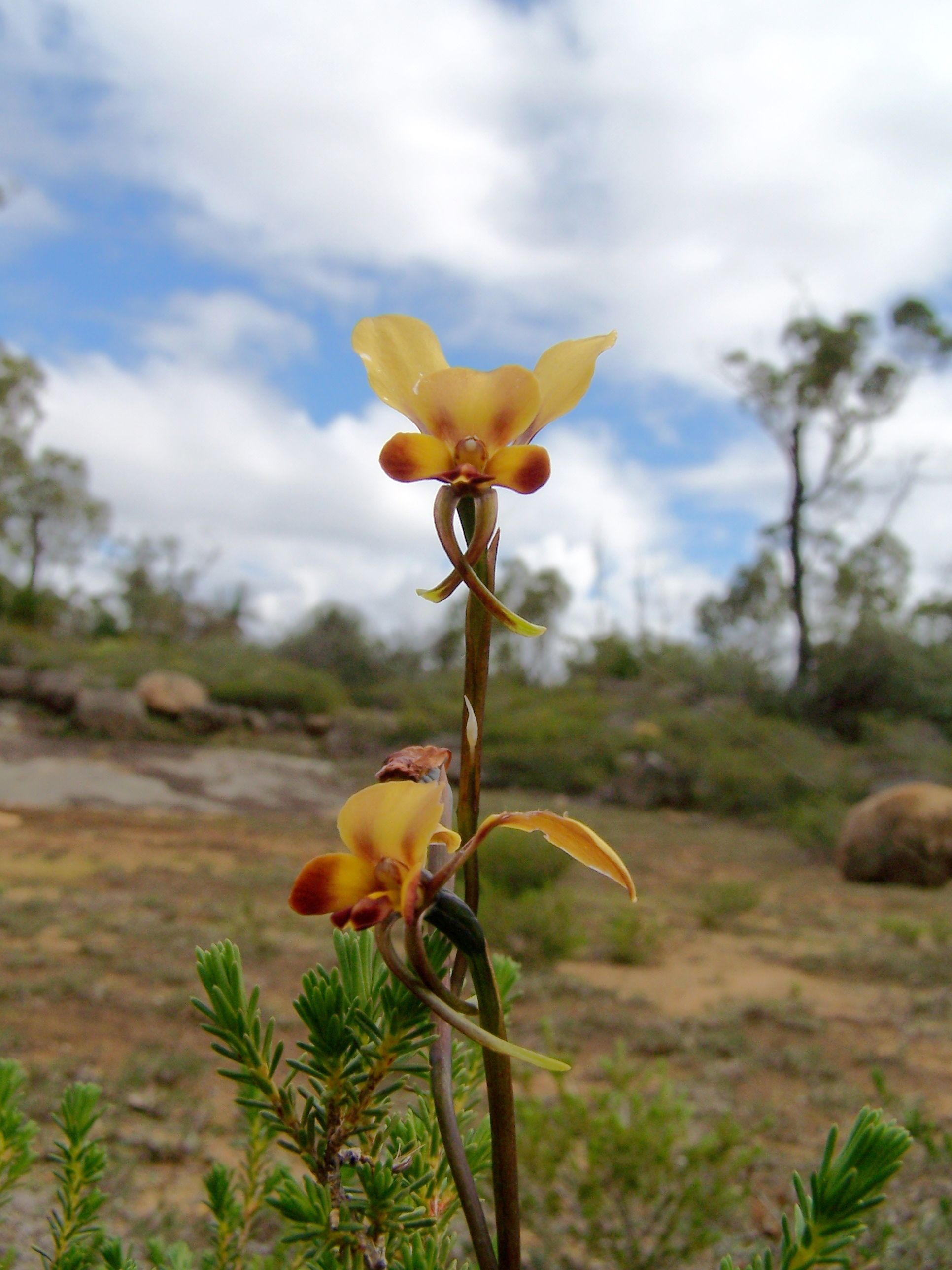

Scientific classification
- Kingdom: Plantae
- Clade: Tracheophytes
- Clade: Angiosperms
- Clade: Monocots
- Order: Asparagales
- Family: Orchidaceae
- Subfamily: Orchidoideae
- Tribe: Diurideae
- Genus: Diuris
- Species: D. brumalis

Binomial name
- Diuris brumalis D.L.Jones

= Diuris brumalis =

Winter donkey orchid

Species of orchid

Diuris brumalis, commonly known as the winter donkey orchid, is a species of orchid that is endemic to the south-west of Western Australia. It is one of the first species of donkey orchid to flower in Western Australia each year and its flowers have been shown to attract the same insects that pollinate other species, but without offering a food reward.

== Description ==
Diuris brumalis is a tuberous, perennial herb, usually growing to a height of 200–500 mm (8–20 in). Two or three leaves emerge at the base of the flowering stem, each leaf 150–200 mm (6–8 in) long and 8–10 mm (0.3–0.4 in) wide. Between three and fifteen yellow and brown flowers are borne on the flowering stem and each is 20–40 mm (0.8–2 in) long and 20–30 mm (0.8–1 in) wide. The dorsal sepal is erect, 6–12 mm (0.2–0.5 in) long and 7–15 mm (0.3–0.6 in) wide and the greenish lateral sepals are 12–24 mm (0.5–0.9 in) long, about 2 mm (0.08 in) wide and turn downwards. The ear-like petals are erect with a stalk 2–6 mm (0.08–0.2 in) long and a blade 10–18 mm (0.4–0.7 in) long and 6–12 mm (0.2–0.5 in) wide. The labellum has three lobes, the lateral ones 6–10 mm (0.2–0.4 in) long and 3–6 mm (0.1–0.2 in) wide. The middle lobe is wedge-shaped, 5–9 mm (0.2–0.4 in) long and 3–7 mm (0.1–0.3 in) wide. There is a single yellow ridge 3–4 mm (0.1–0.2 in) in the mid-line of the labellum. Flowering occurs from June to August.

== Taxonomy and naming ==
Diuris brumalis was first described in 1991 by David Jones from a specimen collected near Kalamunda and the description was published in Australian Orchid Research. The specific epithet (brumalis) is a Latin word meaning "of the shortest day", referring to the winter flowering of this species.

== Distribution and habitat ==
The winter donkey orchid grows in shrubland and forest between Jurien Bay and Collie in the Avon Wheatbelt, Jarrah Forest and Swan Coastal Plain biogeographical regions of Western Australia.

== Ecology ==
The flowers of this orchid resemble those of some Oxylobium and Daviesia species and are visited by the same native bees that pollinate them, even though the orchid does not reward the insects with nectar or pollen.

== Conservation ==
Diuris brumalis is classified as "not threatened" by the Western Australian Government Department of Parks and Wildlife.
