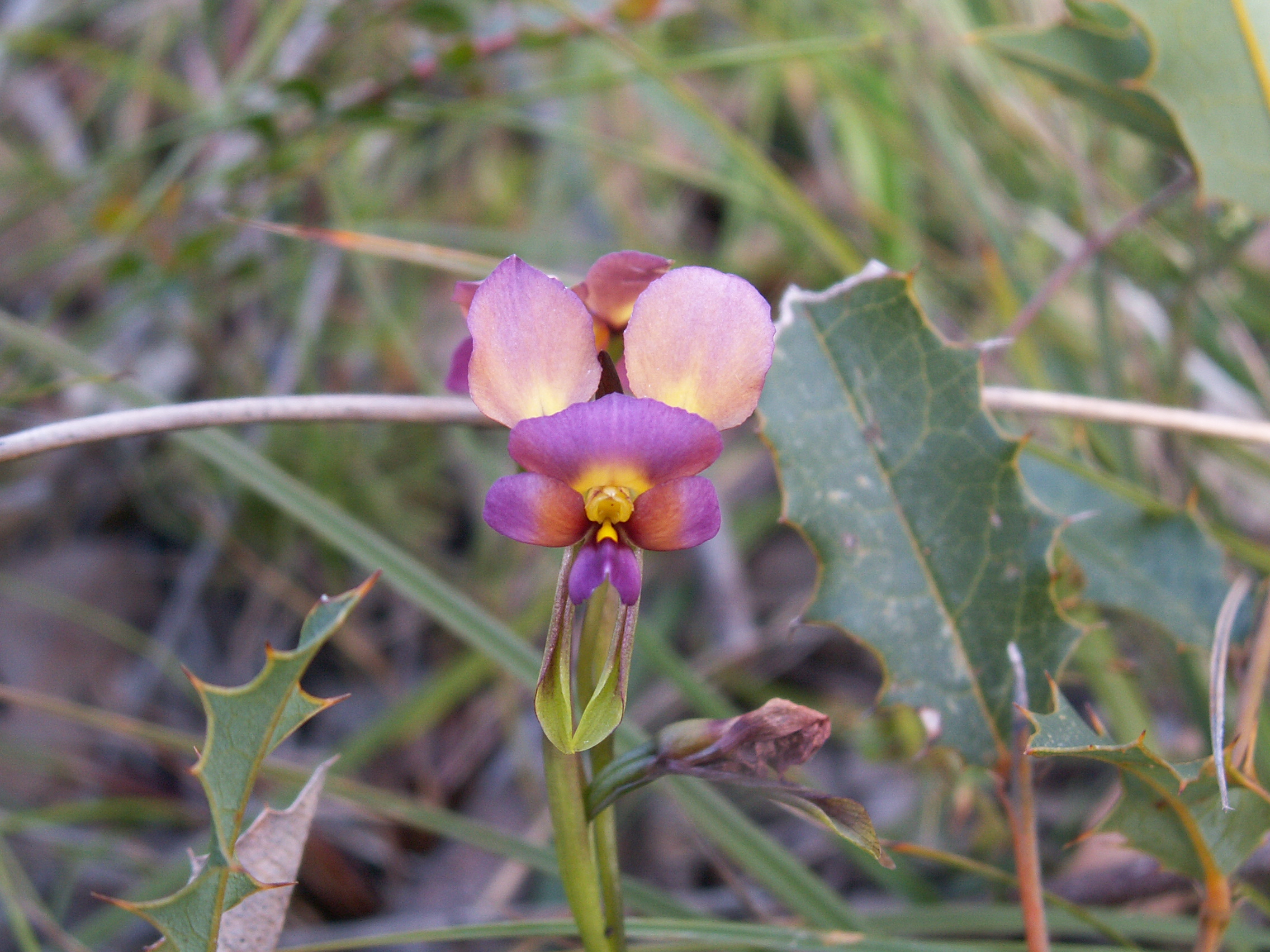
- In Mount Barker.

Scientific classification
- Kingdom: Plantae
- Clade: Embryophytes
- Clade: Tracheophytes
- Clade: Angiosperms
- Clade: Monocots
- Order: Asparagales
- Family: Orchidaceae
- Subfamily: Orchidoideae
- Tribe: Diurideae
- Genus: Diuris
- Species: D. longifolia

Binomial name
- Diuris longifolia R.Br.

= Diuris longifolia =

Purple pansy orchid

Species of orchid

Diuris longifolia, commonly known as purple pansy orchid, is a species of orchid that is endemic to the south-west of Western Australia. It has up to three linear leaves and up to seven purple and mauve flowers with yellowish markings from September to November.

== Description ==
Diuris longifolia is a tuberous, perennial herb with up to three narrowly linear leaves 100–200 mm (3.9–7.9 in) long and 8–10 mm (0.31–0.39 in) wide. Up to seven purple and mauve flowers with yellowish markings, 20–30 mm (0.79–1.18 in) wide are borne on a flowering stem 100–350 mm (3.9–13.8 in) tall. The dorsal sepal is erect, 10–12 mm (0.39–0.47 in) long and wide, the lateral sepals turned abruptly downwards, 16–22 mm (0.63–0.87 in) long and 3–4 mm (0.12–0.16 in) wide. The petals are erect, the blades 11–16 mm (0.43–0.63 in) long and 7–9 mm (0.28–0.35 in) wide on a stalk 4–6 mm (0.16–0.24 in) long. The labellum is 6–9 mm (0.24–0.35 in) long with three lobes - the centre lobe narrowly wedge-shaped, 6–8 mm (0.24–0.31 in) long and 4–5.5 mm (0.16–0.22 in) wide with a down-turned tip, the side lobes spread 6–8 mm (0.24–0.31 in) long and 3–4.5 mm (0.12–0.18 in) wide. There is a single yellow callus 2–4 mm (0.079–0.157 in) along the mid-line of the labellum. Flowering occurs from September to November.

== Taxonomy and naming ==
The species was first formally described in 1810 by Robert Brown in his Prodromus Florae Novae Hollandiae et Insulae Van Diemen. The type specimen was collected by Archibald Menzies near Frenchmans Bay, the present site of the city of Albany around late September or early October 1791. Menzies was surgeon and naturalist on HMS Discovery on the Vancouver Expedition commanded by Captain George Vancouver. It was one of the first three terrestrial orchids to be named from Western Australia, along with Caladenia menziesii (now Leptoceras menziesii) and Caladenia flava.

The specific epithet (longifolia) means "long-leaved".

== Distribution and habitat ==
Purple pansy orchid is found between Perth and Albany, where it grows in sand, lateritic loam, clay and granite in moist situations in shrublands, woodland and forest, in the Jarrah Forest, Swan Coastal Plain and Warren bioregions of south-western Western Australia.

== Conservation status ==
Diuris longifolia is not threatened at present.
