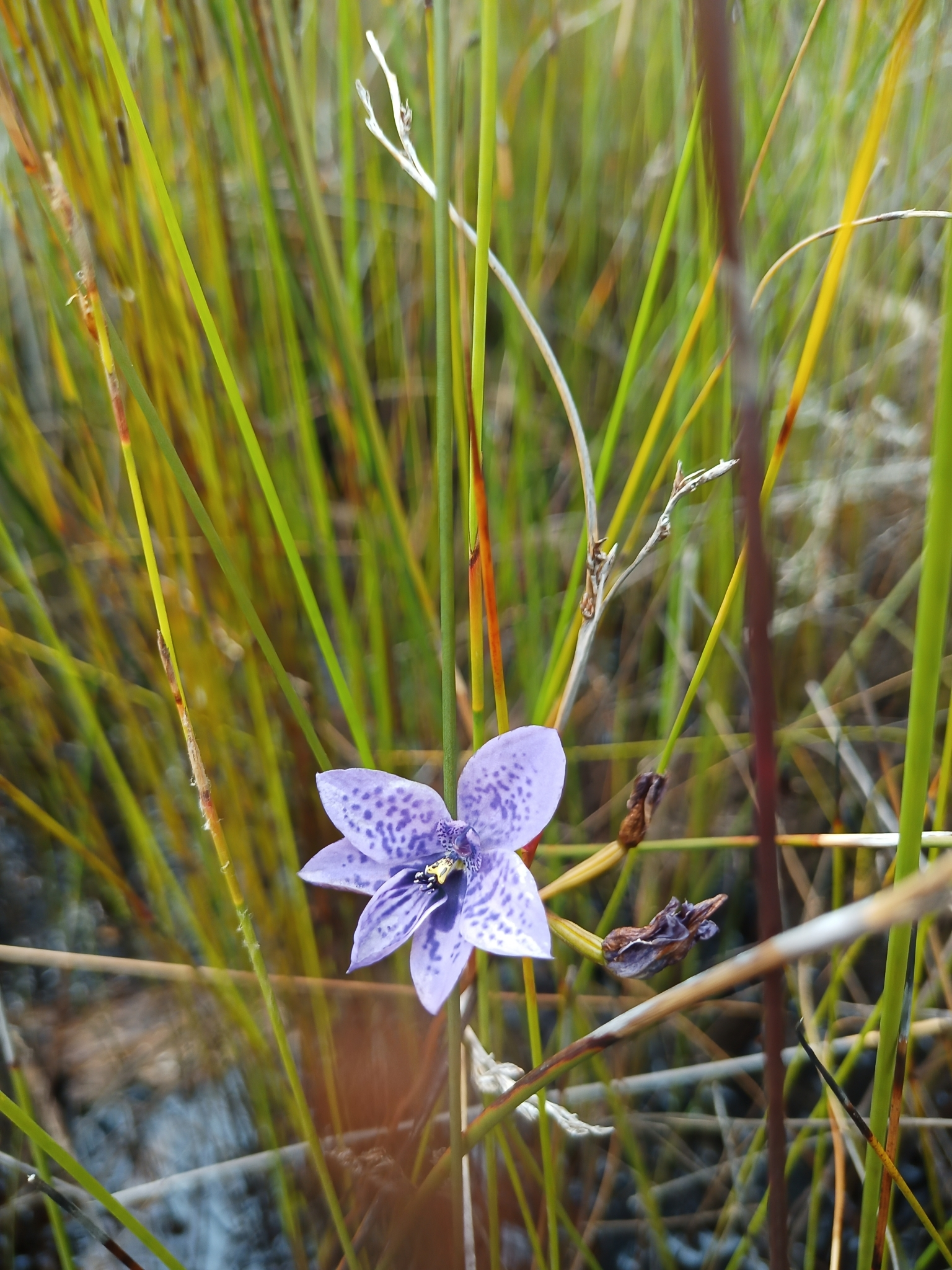
- Near Goode Beach

Scientific classification
- Kingdom: Plantae
- Clade: Tracheophytes
- Clade: Angiosperms
- Clade: Monocots
- Order: Asparagales
- Family: Orchidaceae
- Subfamily: Orchidoideae
- Tribe: Diurideae
- Genus: Epiblema; R.Br. 1810
- Species: E. grandiflorum

Binomial name
- Epiblema grandiflorum R.Br.

= Epiblema grandiflorum =

Species of orchid

Epiblema grandiflorum, commonly known as babe-in-a-cradle, is the only species in the flowering plant genus Epiblema in the orchid family, Orchidaceae and is endemic to the south-west of Western Australia. It is a colony-forming orchid which grows in peaty swamps near the coast. Its flowers are purple with ribbon-like strands attached to its labellum and a broad, petal-like column.

== Description ==
Epiblema grandiflorum is a terrestrial, perennial, deciduous, sympodial herb with a few inconspicuous, fine roots and an oval-shaped tuber lacking a protective sheath. The tuber produces replacement tubers on the end of short, root-like stolons. There is a single, tubular leaf about 20–25 cm (8–10 in) long, about 5 mm (0.2 in) wide at the base of the plant.

There are between two and eight resupinate flowers on the end of a wiry stem 25–80 cm (10–30 in) high. The flowers are purple, 20–40 mm (0.8–2 in) long and wide, on a short stalk surrounded by a leaf-like bract. The three sepals and two lateral petals are free from, and more or less similar to, each other. The labellum is similar in size, shape and colour to the petals and has a callus consisting of a swelling with ribbon-like or club-shaped appendages. The sexual parts of the flower are fused to the column, which is erect and has wing-like structures on its sides. Flowering occurs from late November to January and is followed by the fruit which is a non-fleshy, glabrous, dehiscent capsule containing a large number of seeds.

== Taxonomy and naming ==
This orchid was first formally described in 1810 by Robert Brown and the description was published in Prodromus Florae Novae Hollandiae.

The genus name Epiblema is an Ancient Greek word meaning "a coverlet" or "something thrown over" (such as a blanket) and the specific epithet "grandiflora" is derived from the Latin words grandis meaning "noble" or "magnificent" and flos meaning "flower".

== Distribution and habitat ==
Babe-in-a-cradle grows in wet, peaty swamps, often initially underwater but by the time the flowers appear, the water has usually receded. It is found in coastal areas between Gingin north of Perth and Esperance in the Esperance Plains, Jarrah Forest, Swan Coastal Plain and Warren biogeographic regions.

== Conservation ==
Epiblema grandiflorum is classified as "Not Threatened" by the Government of Western Australia Department of Parks and Wildlife.
