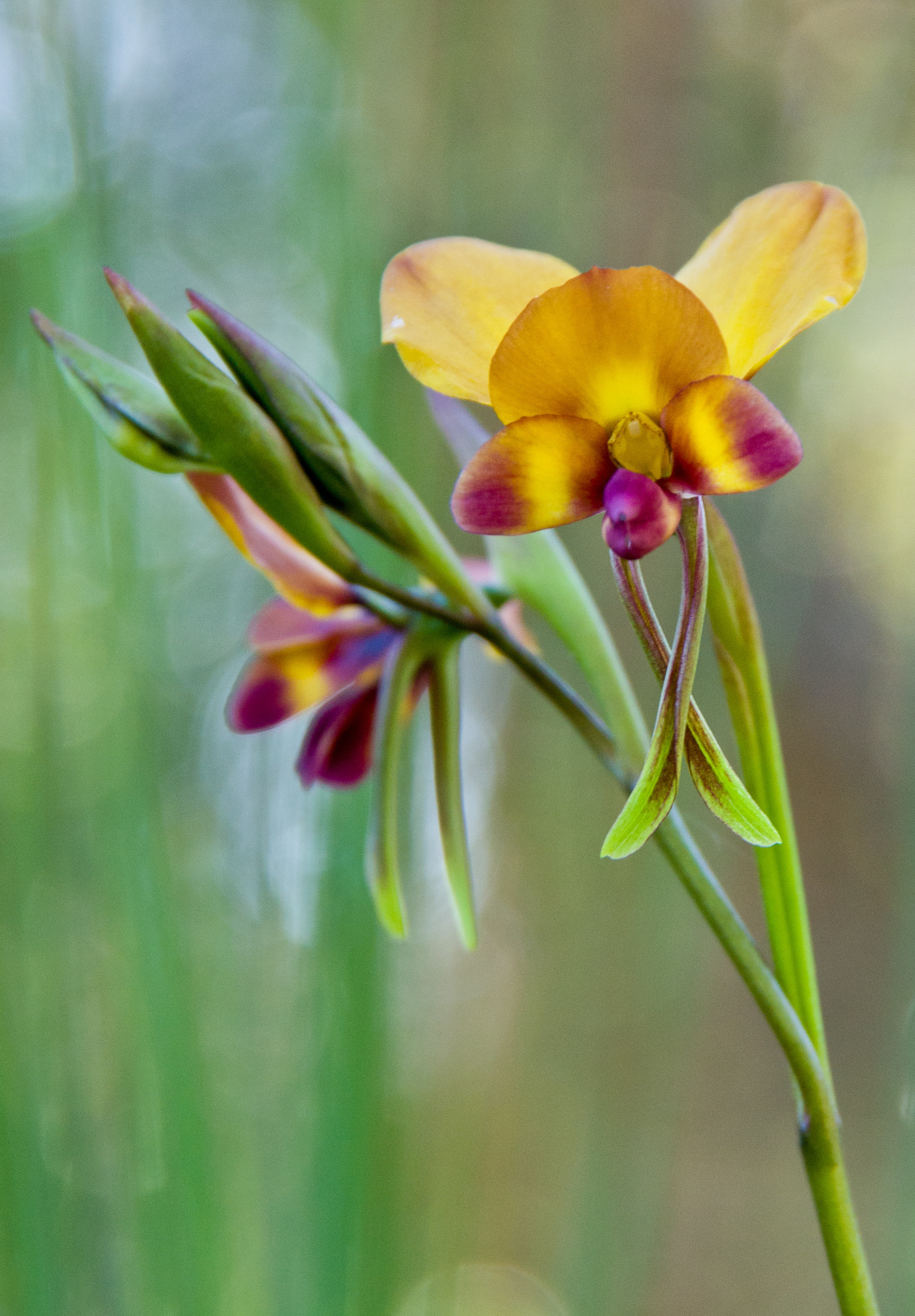
- In Kings Park, Perth

Scientific classification
- Kingdom: Plantae
- Clade: Embryophytes
- Clade: Tracheophytes
- Clade: Angiosperms
- Clade: Monocots
- Order: Asparagales
- Family: Orchidaceae
- Subfamily: Orchidoideae
- Tribe: Diurideae
- Genus: Diuris
- Species: D. corymbosa

Binomial name
- Diuris corymbosa Lindl.

Synonyms
- Diuris aff. corymbosa; Diuris longifolia var. corymbosa (Lindl.) Domin; Diuris longifolia var. parviflora Nicholls

= Diuris corymbosa =

Common donkey orchid

Species of orchid

Diuris corymbosa, commonly called common donkey orchid or wallflower orchid, is a species of orchid which is endemic to the south-west of Western Australia. It is similar to the purple pansy orchid (Diuris longifolia), but its flowers are yellow rather than purple or mauve, and it flowers earlier in the year. It also resembles the winter donkey orchid (Diuris brumalis) but flowers later than that species. It is one of the most common orchid species in the Perth area, often forming extensive colonies and usually having numerous flowers on the one spike.

== Description ==
Diuris corymbosa is a tuberous, perennial herb, usually growing to a height of 20–40 cm (8–20 in) with two or three leaves emerging at the base, 120–250 mm (5–10 in) long and 5–10 mm (0.2–0.4 in) wide. There are up to eight yellow flowers with purple and brown blotches, 20 mm (0.8 in) long and 20–30 mm (0.8–1 in) wide. The flowers have long, wide donkey ear-like petals, a short, wide erect dorsal sepal and narrow, hanging, sometimes crossed lateral sepals. The labellum has three lobes, the lateral ones broad and spreading and the middle lobe short, inverted V-shaped or flattened. Flowering occurs from September, sometimes August, to October.

== Taxonomy and naming ==
Diuris corymbosa was first formally described in 1840 by John Lindley and the description was published in A Sketch of the Vegetation of the Swan River Colony as an appendix to Edwards's Botanical Register. The specific epithet (corymbosa) is derived from the Latin word corymbus meaning "a bunch of flowers" and the suffix -osus meaning "an abundance of", referring to the flower clusters of this species.

== Distribution and habitat ==
The Common donkey orchid occurs between Dongara and Albany where it grows in woodland, often on the margins of swamps.

== Conservation ==
Diuris corymbosa is classified as "not threatened" by the Western Australian Government Department of Parks and Wildlife.

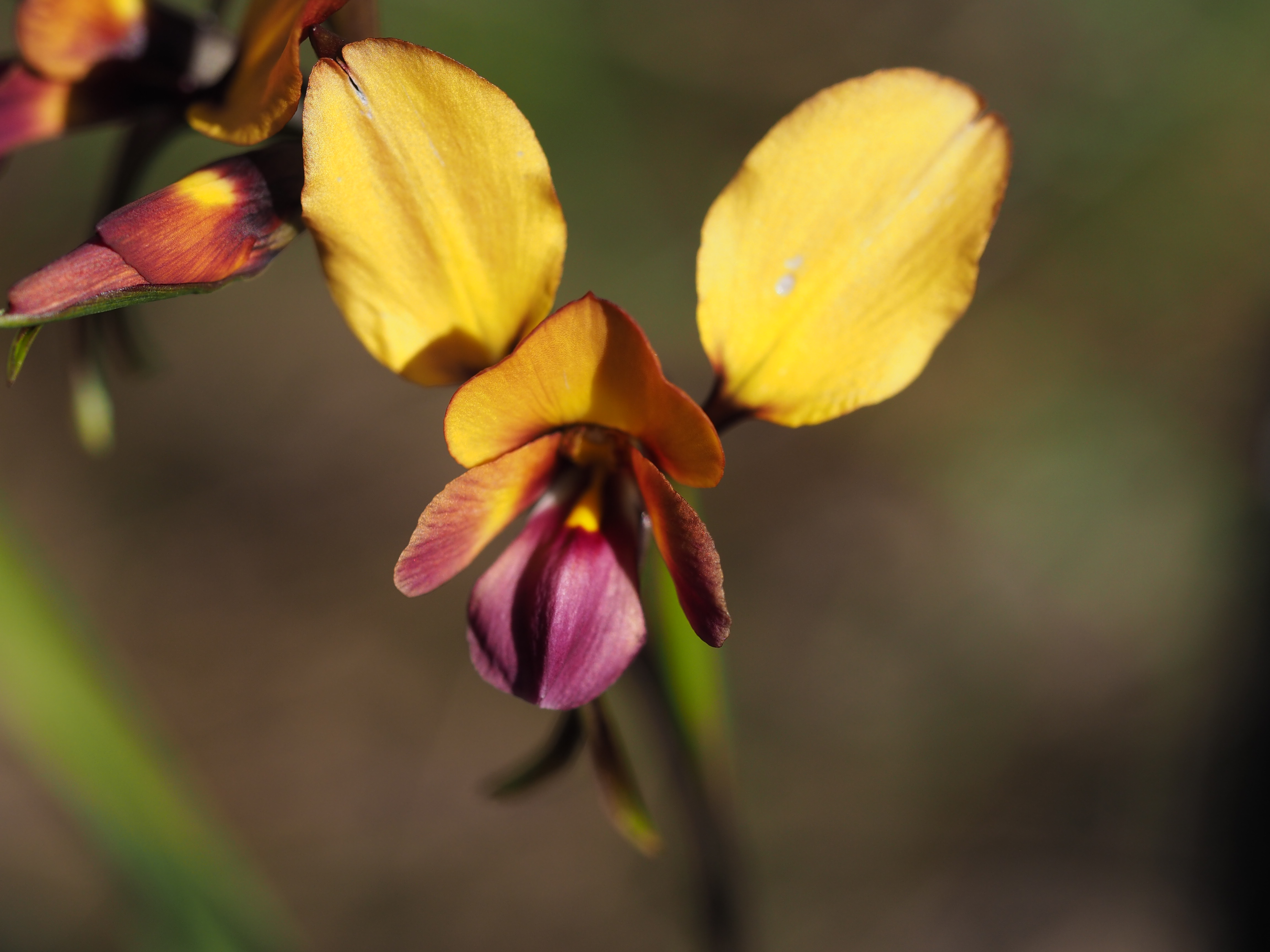
D. corymbosa in Kings Park, Perth

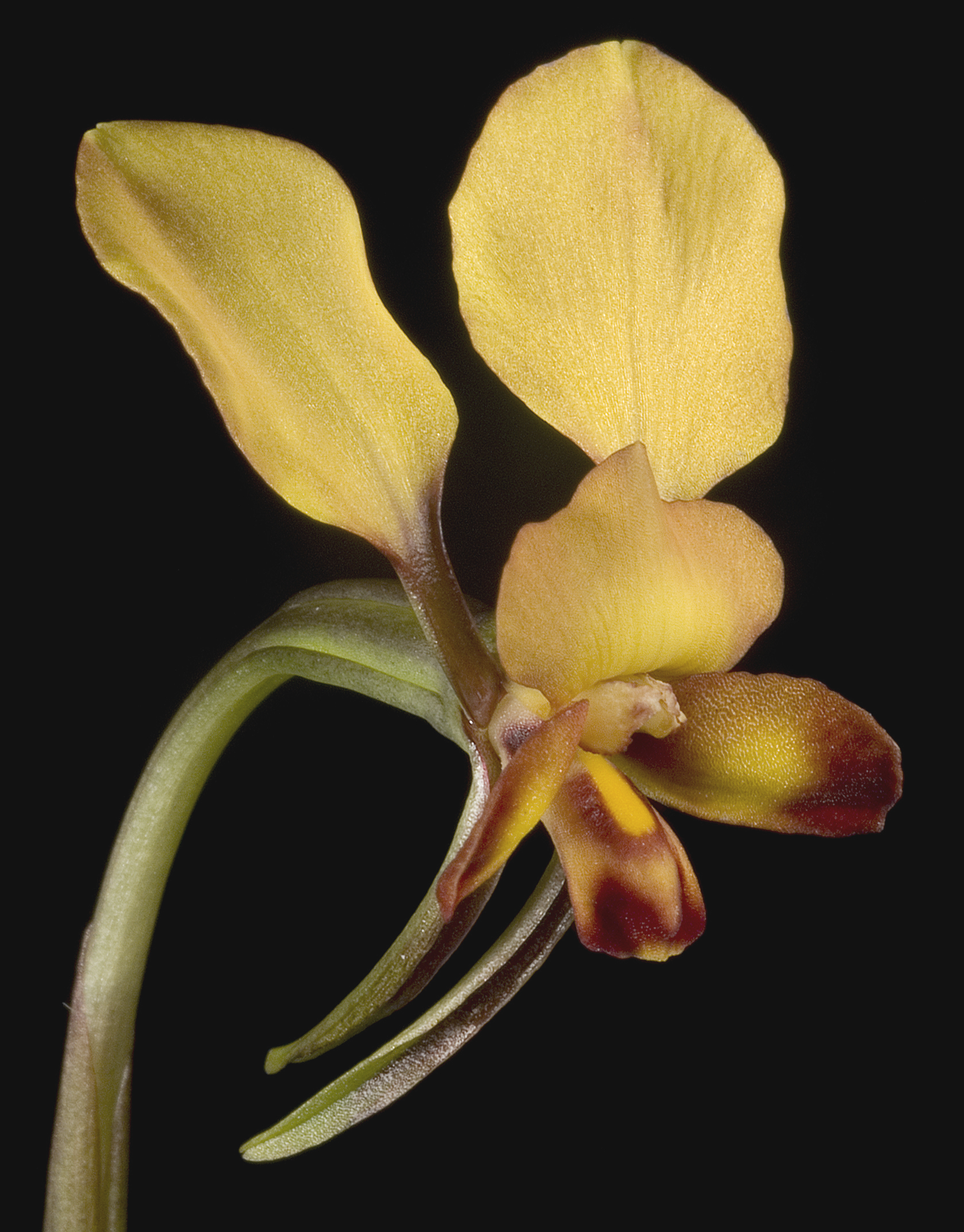
D. corymbosa

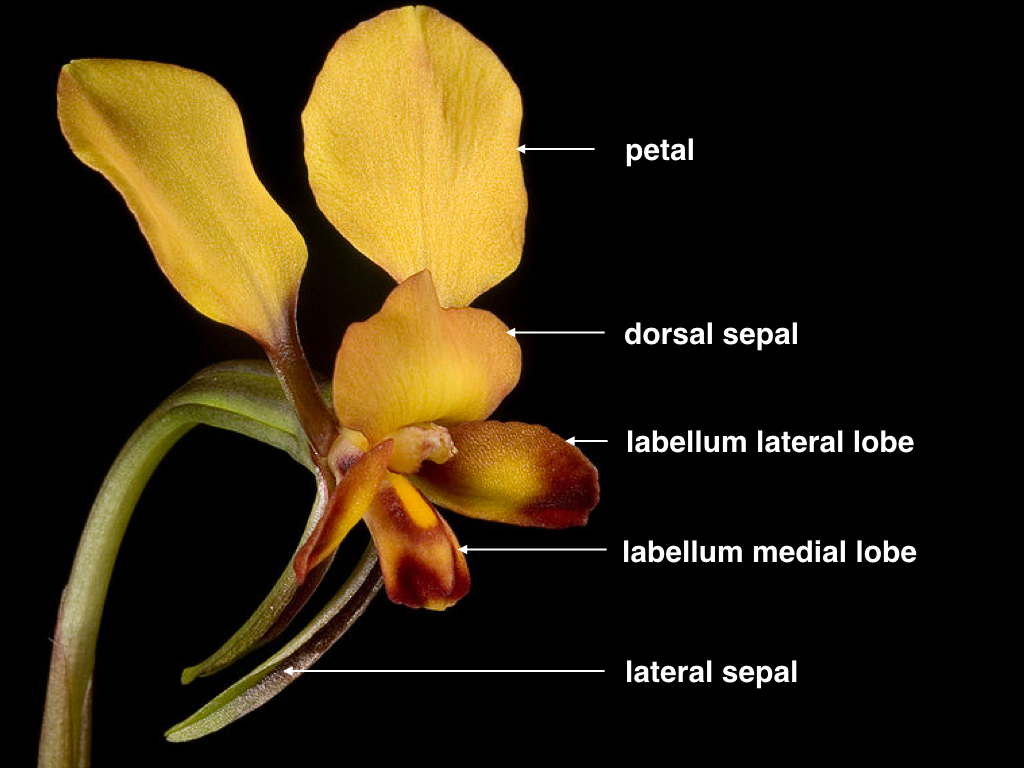
D. corymbosa labelled image
