= David L. Jones (botanist) =

Australian botanist

David Lloyd Jones (born 1944) is an Australian horticultural botanist and the author of many books and papers, especially on Australian orchids.

Jones was born in Victoria and in his youth was a student at Burnley Horticultural College, then the University of Melbourne, graduating with the degree of Bachelor of Science in Agriculture. He was employed for 14 years by the Victorian Department of Agriculture where he helped develop programs involving the nutrient requirements of Australian native plants. He later owned several commercial nurseries. In 1972 his first description of an orchid, Pterostylis aestiva, was published, then in 1978, his first book, Australian Ferns and Fern Allies, written with Stephen Clemesha, was published. In 1987 Jones worked first as a horticultural research officer at the Australian National Botanic Gardens in Canberra and a year later began an intensive study of the taxonomy of Australian plant groups, especially orchids. From 1994 he worked as a research scientist in the Orchid Research Group at the Centre for Plant Biodiversity Research until his retirement in 2007.

Jones facilitated a cooperation with groups of both professional and amateur botanists which has led to the description of many new species. Jones has travelled extensively and visited many remote areas of Australia in the search for new orchid species. He is the author of more than 350 papers describing new species of orchids, 18 of cycads, as well as of other groups including the fern genus Revwattsia, and has published many books on Australian plants. He is described by fellow botanist, Mark Alwin Clements as "without doubt one of the outstanding botanists of our time" and by Rob Cross and Roger Spencer, horticultural botanists at the Royal Botanic Gardens, Melbourne, as "probably the most prolific horticultural botanist that Australia has produced".

The standard author abbreviation D.L.Jones is used to indicate this person as the author when citing a botanical name.

== Bibliography ==
- Jones, D.L., A complete guide to native orchids of Australia, including the island territories New Holland Publishing (2006)
- Jones, D.L., Palms throughout the world Reed Books (1995)
- Jones, David L., Palmiers du monde KÖNEMANN (2000)
- Jones, D.L., Cycads of the world Reed Books (1993)
- Jones, D.L., Cycads of the world – 2nd edition Smithsonian Books (2002)
- Jones, D.L., Palms in Australia Reed New Holland (2000)
- Elliot, W. Rodger & Jones, D.L., Encyclopaedia of Australian plants suitable for cultivation Lothian Publishing Co. Pty. Ltd. (1980)
- Jones, D.L., Native Orchids of Australia Reed Books (1988)
- Jones, D.L. & Elliot, W. Rodger, Lothian Pub. Co. (1986) Pests, diseases and ailments of Australian plants, with suggestions for their control Reed Books (1993)

== Honours ==
- (Orchidaceae) Diuris jonesii C.J.French and G.Brockman
