= List of Thelymitra species =

The following is a list of Thelymitra species accepted by the Index Kewensis at May 2018.

- Thelymitra abrupta R.J.Bates 2016 (S.A.)
- Thelymitra adorata Jeanes 2011 – praying sun orchid (N.S.W.)
- Thelymitra aemula Cheeseman 1919 – gumland sun orchid (N.Z.)
- Thelymitra aggericola D.L.Jones 1999 – bleak sun orchid (Tas.)
- Thelymitra albiflora Jeanes 2004 – white sun orchid (S.A.)
- Thelymitra alcockiae Jeanes 2013 – Kath's sun orchid (Vic., S.A.)
- Thelymitra alpicola Jeanes 2012 – alpine striped sun orchid (N.S.W., Vic.)
- Thelymitra alpina Jeanes 2013 – mountain sun orchid (A.C.T., N.S.W., Vic.)
- Thelymitra angustifolia R.Br. 1810 – long-leaved sun orchid (N.S.W., Qld.)
- Thelymitra antennifera (Lindl.) Hook.f. 1858 – rabbit-eared sun orchid, lemon-scented orchid, vanilla orchid (W.A., S.A., Vic.)
- Thelymitra apiculata (A.S.George) M.A.Clem. & D.L.Jones 1989 – Cleopatra's needles (W.A.)
- Thelymitra arenaria Lindl. 1840 – forest sun orchid (N.S.W., A.C.T., Vic., Tas., S.A.)
- Thelymitra aristata Lindl. 1840 – great sun orchid (N.S.W., Vic., Tas., S.A.)
- Thelymitra atronitida Jeanes – black-hooded sun orchid 2000 (N.S.W., Vic., Tas.)
- Thelymitra azurea R.S.Rogers 1917 – azure sun orchid (Vic.)
- Thelymitra basaltica Jeanes – grasslands sun orchid 2004 (Vic.)
- Thelymitra batesii Jeanes 2004 – plump sun orchid (S.A.)
- Thelymitra benthamiana Rchb.f. 1871 – blotched sun orchid, leopard sun orchid (W.A., S.A., Vic., Tas.)
- Thelymitra bracteata J.Z.Weber ex Jeanes 2004 – leafy sun orchid, large-bracted sun orchid (S.A., Tas., Vic.)
- Thelymitra brevifolia Jeanes 2004 – peppertop sun orchid, short-leaf sun orchid (N.S.W., A.C.T., Vic. Tas., S.A.)
- Thelymitra campanulata Lindl. 1840 – bell-shaped thelymitra, shirt orchid (W.A.)
- Thelymitra canaliculata R.Br. 1810 – flushed sun orchid, blue sun orchid (W.A.)
- Thelymitra carnea R.Br. 1810 – tiny sun orchid (Qld., N.S.W., Vic., Tas., N.Z.)
- Thelymitra × chasmogama R.S.Rogers 2011 – globe-hood sun orchid (S.A., Vic.)
- Thelymitra circumsepta Fitzg. 1878 – naked sun orchid (N.S.W., Vic., S.A., Tas.)
- Thelymitra colensoi Hook.f. 1864 – Colenso's sun orchid (N.Z.)
- Thelymitra cornicina Rchb.f. 1871 – lilac sun orchid (W.A.)
- Thelymitra corrugata R.J.Bates 2013 (S.A.)
- Thelymitra crenulata R.J.Bates 2010 (S.A.)
- Thelymitra crinita Lindl. 1840 – long-haired thelymitra, blue lady orchid (W.A.)
- Thelymitra cucullata Rupp 1946 – swamp sun orchid (W.A.)
- Thelymitra cyanapicata Jeanes 2004 – dark-tipped sun orchid (Vic.)
- Thelymitra cyanea (Lindl.) Benth. 1873 – veined sun orchid (N.S.W., Vic., Tas., S.A., N.Z.)
- Thelymitra dedmaniarum R.S.Rogers 1938 – cinnamon sun orchid (W.A.)
- Thelymitra × dentata L.B.Moore 1968 (N.Z.)
- Thelymitra epipactoides F.Muell. 1866 – metallic sun orchid (Vic., S.A.)
- Thelymitra erosa D.L.Jones & M.A.Clem. 1998 – striped sun orchid (Tas.)
- Thelymitra exigua Jeanes 2004 – short sun orchid (S.A.)
- Thelymitra flexuosa Endl. 1839 – twisted sun orchid (W.A., S.A., Vic., Tas.)
- Thelymitra forbesii Ridl. in H.O.Forbes 1885 (East Timor)
- Thelymitra formosa Colenso 1884 (N.Z.)
- Thelymitra fragrans D.L.Jones & M.A.Clem. 1988 – fragrant sun orchid (Qld., N.S.W.)
- Thelymitra frenchii Jeanes 2004 – scarp sun orchid, Jarrahdale sun orchid (W.A.)
- Thelymitra fuscolutea R.Br. 1810 – chestnut sun orchid (W.A.)
- Thelymitra glaucophylla R.J.Bates ex Jeanes 2013 (S.A.)
- Thelymitra graminea Lindl. 1840 – shy sun orchid (W.A.)
- Thelymitra grandiflora Fitz. 1882 – giant sun orchid (S.A.)
  - Thelymitra grandiflora subsp. exposa R.J.Bates 2014 (S.A.)
  - Thelymitra grandiflora Fitz. subsp. grandiflora 1882 (S.A.)
- Thelymitra granitora D.L.Jones & M.A.Clem. 1998 – coastal granite sun orchid, coastal sun orchid (W.A.)
- Thelymitra gregaria D.L.Jones & M.A.Clem. 1998 – clumping sun orchid (Vic.)
- Thelymitra hatchii L.B.Moore 1968 (N.Z.)
- Thelymitra hiemalis D.L.Jones & M.A.Clem. 1998 – winter sun orchid (Vic.)
- Thelymitra holmesii Nicholls 1932 – plain sun orchid (W.A., S.A., Vic., Tas.)
- Thelymitra hygrophila R.J.Bates 2010 – blue star sun orchid (S.A.)
- Thelymitra imbricata D.L.Jones & M.A.Clem. 1998 – broad sun orchid (Tas.)
- Thelymitra improcera D.L.Jones & M.A.Clem. – coastal sun orchid 1998 (Vic., Tas.)
- Thelymitra incurva Jeanes 2012 – coastal striped sun orchid (Vic., N.S.W.)
- Thelymitra inflata Jeanes 2004 inflated sun orchid (Vic., S.A., Tas.)
- Thelymitra irregularis Nicholls 1946 – crested sun orchid (Vic., N.S.W., Tas.)
- Thelymitra ixioides Sw., 1800 – spotted sun orchid (Qld., N.S.W., Vic., Tas., S.A., N.Z.)
- Thelymitra jacksonii Hopper & A.P.Br. ex jeanes 2006 (W.A.)
- Thelymitra javanica Blume 1825 (Indonesia and the Philippines)
- Thelymitra jonesii Jeanes 2001 – skyblue sun orchid (Tas.)
- Thelymitra juncifolia Lindl. 1840 – large-spotted sun orchid (N.S.W., A.C.T., Vic., Tas., S.A.)
- Thelymitra kangaloonica Jeanes 2011 – Kangaloon sun orchid (N.S.W.)
- Thelymitra latifolia R.J.Bates 2001 (S.A.)
- Thelymitra latiloba Jeanes 2001 – wandoo sun orchid, wandoo shirt orchid (W.A.)
- Thelymitra longifolia J.R.Forst. & G.Forst. 1775 – white sun orchid, maikuku (N.Z.)
- Thelymitra longiloba D.L.Jones & M.A.Clem. 1998 – lobed sun orchid (N.S.W., Vic., Tas.)
- Thelymitra lucida Jeanes 2004 – glistening sun orchid (Vic., Tas.)
- Thelymitra luteocilium Fitzg. 1882 – fringed sun orchid (S.A., Vic.)
- Thelymitra × mackibbinii (= Thelymitra mackibbinii) F.Muell. 1881 – brilliant sun orchid (S.A., Vic.)
- Thelymitra × macmillanii F.Muell. 1865 – red sun orchid, crimson sun orchid (S.A., Vic.)
- Thelymitra macrophylla Lindl. 1840 – large-leafed thelymitra (W.A.)
- Thelymitra maculata Jeanes 2009 – spotted curly locks, eastern curly locks (W.A.)
- Thelymitra magnifica Jeanes 2006 (W.A.) – Crystal Brook sun orchid
- Thelymitra malvina M.A.Clem., D.L.Jones & Molloy 1989 – mauve-tufted sun orchid (Qld., N.S.W., Vic., Tas., S.A., N.Z.)
- Thelymitra matthewsii Cheeseman 1910 (publ. 1911) – spiral sun orchid (Vic., S.A., N.Z.)
- Thelymitra media R.Br. 1810 – tall sun orchid (N.S.W., Vic., Tas.)
  - Thelymitra media R.Br.var. media (N.S.W., Vic.)
  - Thelymitra media var. carneolutea Nicholls 1943 (Vic.)
- Thelymitra megacalyptra Fitzg. 1879 – plains sun orchid (N.S.W., Vic., A.C.T., S.A.)
- Thelymitra merraniae Nicholls 1929 – Merran's sun orchid (N.S.W., S.A., Vic., Tas.)
- Thelymitra mucida Fitzg. 1882 – plum sun orchid (W.A., S.A., Vic., Tas.)
- Thelymitra nervosa Colenso 1887 (publ. 1888) (N.Z.)
- Thelymitra nuda R.Br. 1810 – plain thelymitra (N.S.W., A.C.T., Vic. Tas., S.A.)
- Thelymitra occidentalis Jeanes 2001 – western azure sun orchid, rimmed sun orchid (W.A., S.A.)
- Thelymitra odora R.J.Bates 2010 (S.A.)
- Thelymitra orientalis R.J.Bates 2010 (Vic.)
- Thelymitra pallidiflora Jeanes 2004 –pale sun orchid (Vic.)
- Thelymitra pallidifructus R.J.Bates 2010 (S.A.)
- Thelymitra paludosa Jeanes 2013 (W.A.)
- Thelymitra papuana J.J.Sm. 1934 – Papua thelymitra (New Guinea)
- Thelymitra pauciflora R.Br. 1810 – slender sun orchid (Qld., N.S.W., A.C.T., Vic., Tas., S.A., N.Z.)
- Thelymitra peniculata Jeanes 2004 – trim sun orchid (N.S.W., Vic., S.A., A.C.T., Tas.)
- Thelymitra petrophila Jeanes 2013 (W.A.)
- Thelymitra planicola Jeanes 2000 – glaucous sun orchid (Vic., N.S.W.)
- Thelymitra polychroma D.L.Jones & M.A.Clem. 1998 – rainbow sun orchid (Tas.)
- Thelymitra psammophila C.R.P.Andrews 1905 – sandplain sun orchid (W.A.)
- Thelymitra pulchella Hook.f. 1853 (N.Z.)
- Thelymitra pulcherrima Jeanes 2009 – northern Queen of Sheba (W.A.)
- Thelymitra purpurata Rupp 1946 – wallum sun orchid (Qld., N.S.W.)
- Thelymitra purpureofusca Colenso 1880 (N.Z.)
- Thelymitra queenslandica Jeanes – northern sun orchid 2013 (Qld.)
- Thelymitra reflexa Jeanes 2005 – reflexed sun orchid (Vic.)
- Thelymitra rubra Fitzg. 1882 – salmon sun orchid (N.S.W., Vic., Tas., S.A.)
- Thelymitra rubricaulis R.J.Bates 2010 (S.A.)
- Thelymitra sanscilia H.S.Irwin ex Hatch 1952 (N.Z.)
- Thelymitra sarasiniana Kraenzl. in F.Sarasin & J.Roux 1914 (New Caledonia)
- Thelymitra sargentii R.S.Rogers 1930 – freckled sun orchid (W.A.)
- Thelymitra silena D.L.Jones 1999 – madonna sun orchid (Tas.)
- Thelymitra simulata D.L.Jones & M.A.Clem. 1998 – collared sun orchid (N.S.W., A.C.T., Vic., Tas.)
- Thelymitra spadicea D.L.Jones & M.A.Clem. 1998 – browntop sun orchid (Tas.)
- Thelymitra sparsa D.L.Jones & M.A.Clem. 1998 – wispy sun orchid (Tas.)
- Thelymitra speciosa Jeanes 2009 – eastern Queen of Sheba (W.A.)
- Thelymitra spiralis (Lindl.) F.Muell. 1865 – curly locks (W.A.)
- Thelymitra stellata Lindl. 1840 – starry sun orchid, star orchid (W.A.)
- Thelymitra tholiformis Molloy & Hatch 1990 (N.Z.)
- Thelymitra tigrina R.Br. 1810 – tiger orchid, tiger sun orchid (W.A.)
- Thelymitra × truncata R.S.Rogers 1917 – truncate sun orchid (Vic., S.A., Tas.)
- Thelymitra uliginosa Jeanes 2009 – southern curly locks, swamp curly locks (W.A.)
- Thelymitra variegata (Lindl.) F.Muell. 1865 – Queen of Sheba (W.A.)
- Thelymitra venosa R.Br. 1810 – large veined sun orchid (N.S.W.)
- Thelymitra villosa Lindl. 1840 – custard orchid (W.A.)
- Thelymitra viridis Jeanes 2004 – green sun orchid (Tas.)
- Thelymitra vulgaris Jeanes 2004 – slender sun orchid, common sun orchid (W.A.)
- Thelymitra xanthotricha Jeanes 2004 – yellow tufted sun orchid (W.A.)
- Thelymitra yorkensis Jeanes 2006 – York sun orchid, bronze sun orchid (W.A.)

== Natural hybrids ==
- Thelymitra × chasmogama R.S.Rogers 1927 (T. luteocilium × T. nuda)
- Thelymitra × dentata L.B.Moore 1968 (T. longifolia × T. pulchella)
- Thelymitra × mackibbinii F.Muell. 1881 (T. × macmillanii × T. nuda)
- Thelymitra × macmillanii F.Muell. 1865 (T. antennifera × T. luteocilium)
- Thelymitra × truncata R.S.Rogers 1917

== Intergeneric hybrid ==
- xCalomitra (Calochilus x Thelymitra) (unplaced name)
