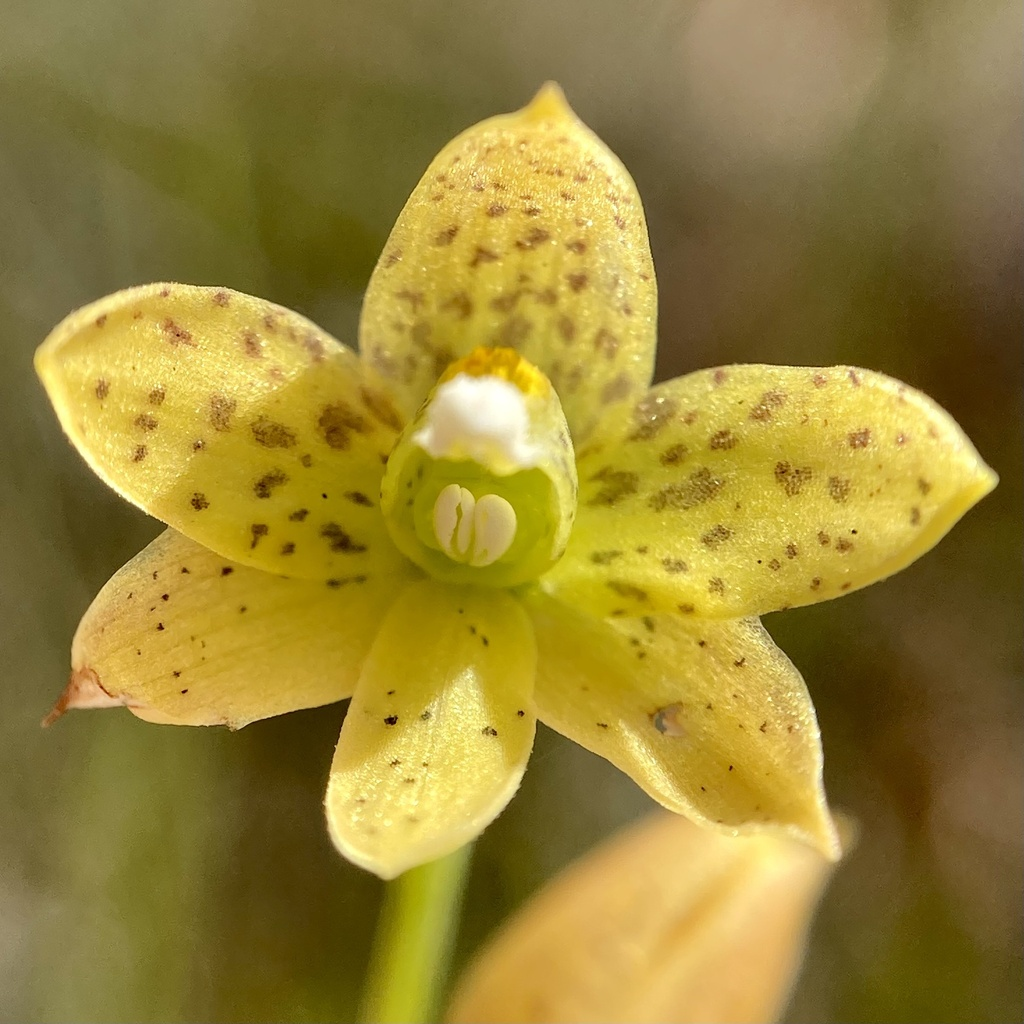
- In Mount Frankland National Park

Scientific classification
- Kingdom: Plantae
- Clade: Embryophytes
- Clade: Tracheophytes
- Clade: Angiosperms
- Clade: Monocots
- Order: Asparagales
- Family: Orchidaceae
- Subfamily: Orchidoideae
- Tribe: Diurideae
- Genus: Thelymitra
- Species: T. tigrina

Binomial name
- Thelymitra tigrina R.Br.

= Thelymitra tigrina =

Tiger orchid

Species of orchid

Thelymitra tigrina, commonly called tiger orchid or tiger sun orchid, is a species of orchid that is endemic to the south-west of Western Australia. It has a single narrow leaf and up to fifteen small yellow flowers with small brown spots.

== Description ==
Thelymitra tigrina is a tuberous, perennial herb with a single leaf 100–150 mm (4–6 in) long and 3–4 mm (0.1–0.2 in) wide. Between two and fifteen yellow, cup-shaped flowers with many dark brown spots, 10–16 mm (0.4–0.6 in) wide are borne on a flowering stem 150–700 mm (6–30 in) tall. The sepals and petals are 5–8 mm (0.2–0.3 in) long and 3–5 mm (0.1–0.2 in) wide. The column is a similar colour to the sepals and petals, 3–4 mm (0.12–0.16 in) long, about 2 mm (0.08 in) wide and has short, white, pimply arms on the sides. The lobe on top of the anther is short and covered with small bumps. The flowers are self-pollinated and open on hot, sunny days. Flowering occurs from November to January.

== Taxonomy and naming ==
Thelymitra tigrina was first formally described in 1810 by Robert Brown and the description was published in Prodromus Florae Novae Hollandiae et Insulae Van Diemen. The specific epithet (tigrina) is a Latin word meaning "of tigers", referring to the colour of the flowers.

== Distribution and habitat ==
Tiger orchid grows in dense scrub in near-coastal, winter-wet scrub. It is found between Perth and Albany with a disjunct population near Esperance.

== Conservation ==
Thelymitra tigrina is classified as "not threatened" in Western Australia by the Western Australian Government Department of Parks and Wildlife.
