= Thelymitra crenulata =

Scientific classification
- Kingdom: Plantae
- Clade: Embryophytes
- Clade: Tracheophytes
- Clade: Angiosperms
- Clade: Monocots
- Order: Asparagales
- Family: Orchidaceae
- Subfamily: Orchidoideae
- Tribe: Diurideae
- Genus: Thelymitra
- Species: T. crenulata

Binomial name
- Thelymitra crenulata R.J.Bates

Species of orchid

Thelymitra crenulata is a species of orchid in the family Orchidaceae and is endemic to a small area of South Australia. It has a single, fleshy linear leaf and up to seven deep blue flowers with darker lines. It was only discovered in 2003, but is sometimes common in its range near Mount Gambier after wet weather in spring.

== Description ==
Thelymitra crenulata is a tuberous, perennial herb with a single erect, fleshy, channelled, linear leaf 60–200 mm (2–8 in) long and 1–3 mm (0.04–0.1 in) wide with a purplish base. Up to seven deep blue flowers with darker veins, 10–12 mm (0.4–0.5 in) wide are borne on a flowering stem 150–300 mm (6–10 in) tall. The sepals and petals are 6–7 mm (0.2–0.3 in) long and 4–5 mm (0.2–0.2 in) wide. The column is blue, about 4 mm (0.2 in) long and 2 mm (0.08 in) wide. The lobe on the top of the anther is tube-shaped, curved forwards and dark brown with a yellow tip. The side lobes curve sharply upwards and have mop-like tufts of white hairs on their ends. The flowers open for only a short period on warm, sunny days. Flowering occurs between late October and mid-November but often for only a week. Flowering is more prolific after a wet spring.

== Taxonomy and naming ==
Thelymitra crenulata was first formally described in 2010 by Robert Bates from a specimen he collected near Glencoe in 2003. The description was published in the Journal of the Adelaide Botanic Garden. The specific epithet (crenulata) is a Latin word meaning "minutely crenate, referring to the crinkled anther lobe.

== Distribution and habitat ==
Thelymitra crenulata grows in disturbed areas such as firebreaks and tracks in heath near waterholes. It is only known from near Mount Gambier.
