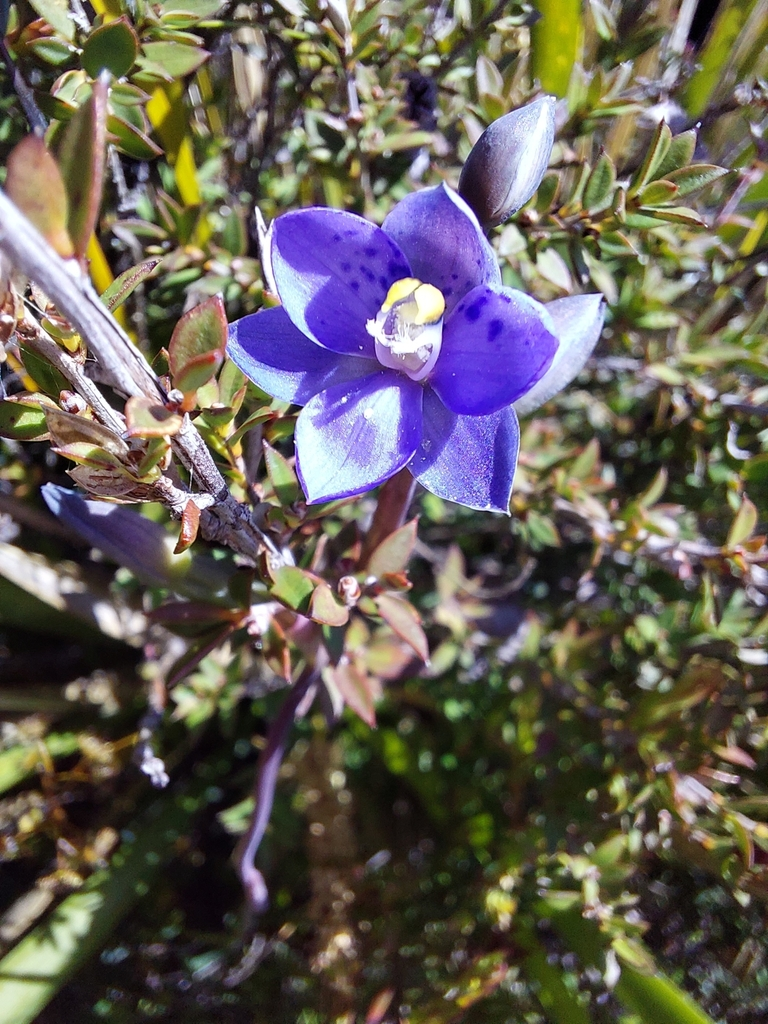
- Near Couta Rocks

Scientific classification
- Kingdom: Plantae
- Clade: Embryophytes
- Clade: Tracheophytes
- Clade: Angiosperms
- Clade: Monocots
- Order: Asparagales
- Family: Orchidaceae
- Subfamily: Orchidoideae
- Tribe: Diurideae
- Genus: Thelymitra
- Species: T. spadicea

Binomial name
- Thelymitra spadicea D.L.Jones

= Thelymitra spadicea =

Browntop sun orchid

Species of orchid

Thelymitra spadicea, commonly called browntop sun orchid, is a species of orchid that is endemic to Tasmania. It has a single erect, fleshy leaf and up to four relatively small blue flowers with small darker spots and an elongated lobe on top of the anther.

== Description ==
Thelymitra spadicea is a tuberous, perennial herb with a single erect, fleshy, channelled, linear leaf 100–220 mm (4–9 in) long and 4–8 mm (0.2–0.3 in) wide with a reddish base. Up to four blue flowers with small darker spots, 16–22 mm (0.6–0.9 in) wide are arranged on a flowering stem 100–250 mm (4–10 in) tall. The sepals and petals are 7–11 mm (0.3–0.4 in) long and 5–6 mm (0.20–0.24 in) wide. The column is bluish white, about 4 mm (0.2 in) long and 2 mm (0.08 in) wide. The lobe on the top of the anther is brown with a blue band, a yellow elongated tip and small teeth. The side lobes have dense, mop-like tufts of white hairs. Flowering occurs in November and December.

== Taxonomy and naming ==
Thelymitra spadicea was first formally described in 1999 by David Jones from a specimen collected near Stanley and the description was published in Australian Orchid Research. The specific epithet (spadicea) is a Latin word meaning “of a light brown colour", referring to the colour of the anther lobe.

== Distribution and habitat ==
Browntop sun orchid grows in coastal and near coastal heath in northern and western Tasmania.
