= Thelymitra frenchii =

Scarp sun orchid

Scientific classification
- Kingdom: Plantae
- Clade: Embryophytes
- Clade: Tracheophytes
- Clade: Angiosperms
- Clade: Monocots
- Order: Asparagales
- Family: Orchidaceae
- Subfamily: Orchidoideae
- Tribe: Diurideae
- Genus: Thelymitra
- Species: T. frenchii

Binomial name
- Thelymitra frenchii Jeanes

Species of orchid

Thelymitra frenchii, commonly called scarp sun orchid or Jarrahdale sun orchid, is a species of orchid in the family Orchidaceae and endemic to a small area in the south-west of Western Australia. It has a single long, fleshy leaf and up to three relatively small, blue flowers.

== Description ==
Thelymitra frenchii is a tuberous, perennial herb with a single channelled, fleshy, pale green, linear to lance-shaped leaf 60–120 mm (2–5 in) long and 5–12 mm (0.2–0.5 in) wide. Up to three blue flowers, 18–25 mm (0.7–1 in) wide are borne on a flowering stem 50–140 mm (2–6 in) tall. The sepals and petals are 8–12 mm (0.3–0.5 in) long and 3.5–6 mm (0.1–0.2 in) wide. The column is bluish to pinkish, about 5 mm (0.2 in) long and 3 mm (0.1 in) wide. The lobe on the top of the anther is 2–3 mm (0.08–0.1 in) long and about 2 mm (0.08 in) wide, mostly yellow with a narrow purplish band and a broad, shallow notch. The side lobes have toothbrush-like tufts of white hairs. The flowers remain open even in cool weather and until late in the day. Flowering has only been observed in October.

== Taxonomy and naming ==
Thelymitra frenchii was first formally described in 2004 by Jeff Jeanes from a specimen collected near Jarrahdale and the description was published in Muelleria. The specific epithet (frenchii) honours "Christopher (Chris) J. French" for his assistance to the author.

== Distribution and habitat ==
Scarp sun orchid grows in soil pockets on granite outcrops in jarrah forest. It is only known from near Jarrahdale in the Jarrah Forest biogeographic region.

== Conservation ==
Thelymitra frenchii is classified as "not threatened" by the Western Australian Government Department of Parks and Wildlife.
