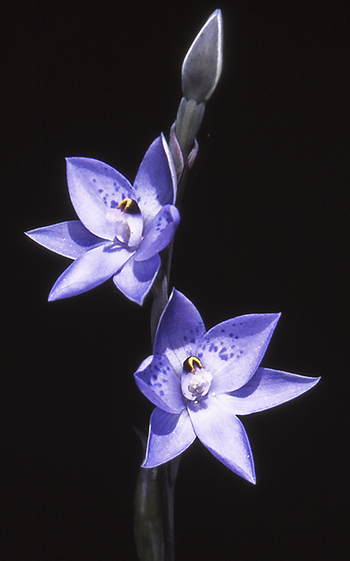
- In Namadgi National Park

Scientific classification
- Kingdom: Plantae
- Clade: Tracheophytes
- Clade: Angiosperms
- Clade: Monocots
- Order: Asparagales
- Family: Orchidaceae
- Subfamily: Orchidoideae
- Tribe: Diurideae
- Genus: Thelymitra
- Species: T. simulata

Binomial name
- Thelymitra simulata D.L.Jones

= Thelymitra simulata =

Collared sun orchid

Species of orchid

Thelymitra simulata, commonly called collared sun orchid, is a species of orchid that is endemic to south-eastern Australia. It has a single fleshy, channelled leaf and up to six blue flowers with small darker spots. It grows in higher altitudes places part and the flowers have a purple lobe with a yellow tip on top of the anther.

== Description ==
Thelymitra simulata is a tuberous, perennial herb with a single fleshy, channelled, linear to lance-shaped leaf 100–150 mm (4–6 in) long and 2–3 mm (0.08–0.1 in) wide with a reddish base. Up to six blue flowers with darker spots, 20–25 mm (0.8–1 in) wide are arranged on a flowering stem 200–560 mm (8–20 in) tall. The sepals and petals are 10–13 mm (0.4–0.5 in) long and 7–8 mm (0.28–0.31 in) wide. The column is bluish white, 6–7 mm (0.2–0.3 in) long and 3–4 mm (0.1–0.2 in) wide. The lobe on the top of the anther is brownish purple with a yellow tip and small teeth. The side lobes have mop-like tufts of white hairs. Flowering occurs in December and January but the flowers are self-pollinated and only open on hot days.

== Taxonomy and naming ==
Thelymitra simulata was first formally described in 1998 by David Jones and the description was published in Australian Orchid Research. The specific epithet (simulata) is a Latin word meaning “imitate" or "copy", referring to the similarity of this species to T. × truncata.

== Distribution and habitat ==
Collared sun orchid grows in montane and subalpine grassland, woodland and forest in New South Wales, the Australian Capital Territory, Victoria and Tasmania.
