= Thelymitra orientalis =

Conservation status
- Critically Endangered (IUCN 3.1)

Scientific classification
- Kingdom: Plantae
- Clade: Tracheophytes
- Clade: Angiosperms
- Clade: Monocots
- Order: Asparagales
- Family: Orchidaceae
- Subfamily: Orchidoideae
- Tribe: Diurideae
- Genus: Thelymitra
- Species: T. orientalis

Binomial name
- Thelymitra orientalis R.J.Bates

Species of orchid

Thelymitra orientalis is a rare species of orchid in the family Orchidaceae and is endemic to southern continental Australia. It has a single thread-like, cylindrical leaf and a single deep blue, streaked flower. It is similar to T. mucida but is distinguished from that species by its filiform leaf and smaller flower.

== Description ==
Thelymitra orientalis is a tuberous, perennial herb with a single thread-like, cylindrical leaf about 50 mm (2 in) long and 2 mm (0.08 in) wide with a red base. A single deep blue flower with 6 to 8 darker streaks, up to 10 mm (0.4 in) wide is borne on a flowering stem up to 100 mm (4 in) tall. The sepals and petals are 5–7 mm (0.2–0.3 in) long and 4–5 mm (0.16–0.20 in) wide. The column is a rich purple colour, 3–4 mm (0.12–0.16 in) long and about 2 mm (0.08 in) wide. The lobe on the top of the anther is black with a yellow tip divided into two parts with wavy edges. The side lobes have a few yellow hairs. Flowering occurs between late October and early-November and the flowers only open on hot days.

== Taxonomy and naming ==
Thelymitra orientalis was first formally described in 2010 by Robert Bates from a specimen he collected in The Marshes Native Forest Reserve near Millicent in 2003. The description was published in the Journal of the Adelaide Botanic Garden. The specific epithet (orientalis) is a Latin word meaning "of the east", referring to fact that this orchid is related to T. mucida which is mainly a Western Australian species.

== Distribution and habitat ==
This thelymitra grows in damp heath in high rainfall areas. It is found in western Victoria and the far south-east of South Australia.
