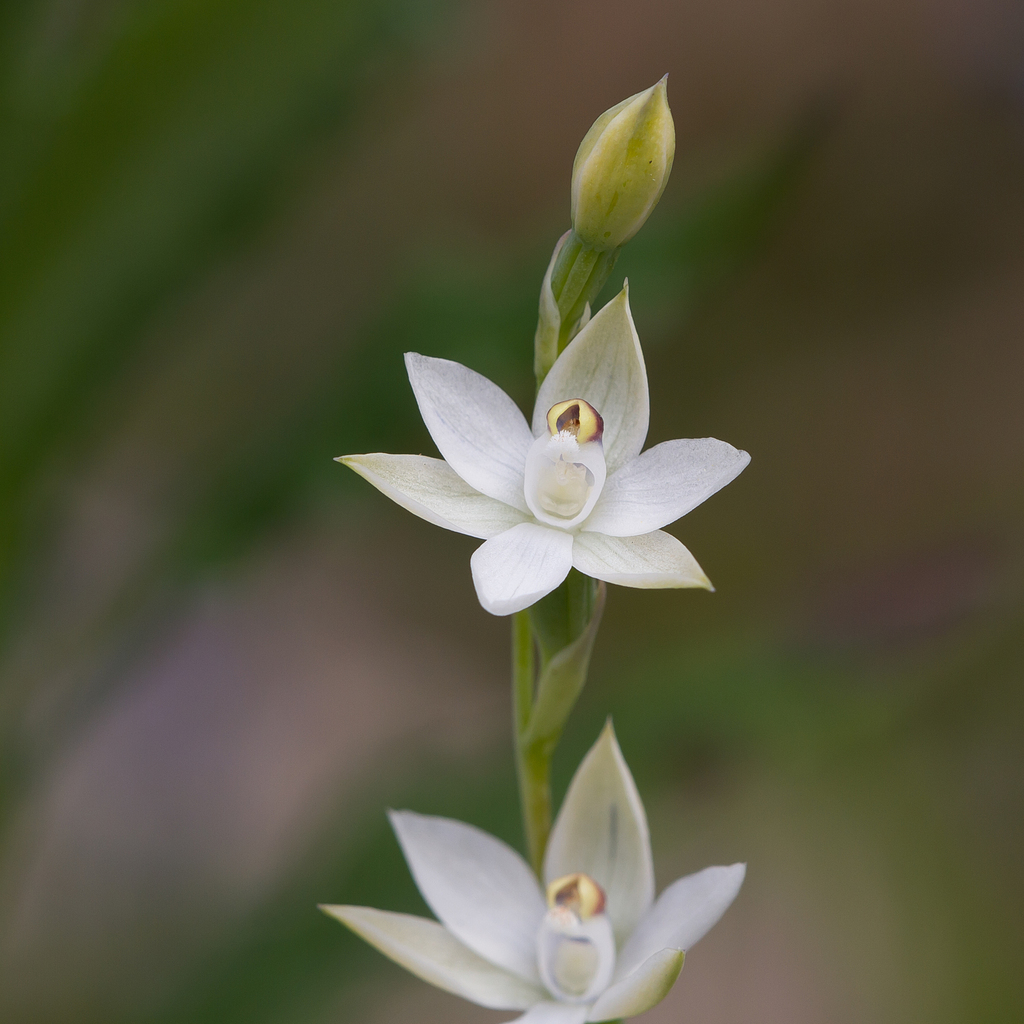
- Near Dorset Vale

Scientific classification
- Kingdom: Plantae
- Clade: Embryophytes
- Clade: Tracheophytes
- Clade: Angiosperms
- Clade: Monocots
- Order: Asparagales
- Family: Orchidaceae
- Subfamily: Orchidoideae
- Tribe: Diurideae
- Genus: Thelymitra
- Species: T. albiflora

Binomial name
- Thelymitra albiflora Jeanes

= Thelymitra albiflora =

White sun orchid

Species of orchid

Thelymitra albiflora, commonly called white sun orchid, is a species of orchid that is endemic to South Australia. It has a single erect, narrow, fleshy leaf and up to ten relatively small white flowers with white toothbrush-like tufts on top of the anther.

== Description ==
Thelymitra albiflora is a tuberous, perennial herb with a single erect, channelled, green, linear to lance-shaped leaf 100–300 mm (4–10 in) long and 1–3 mm (0.04–0.1 in) wide with a purplish base. Up to ten white or pale blue flowers 15–20 mm (0.6–0.8 in) wide are borne on a flowering stem 100–500 mm (4–20 in) tall. The sepals and petals are 6–10 mm (0.2–0.4 in) long and 3–6 mm (0.1–0.2 in) wide. The column is white or pale blue, 4–5.5 mm (0.16–0.22 in) long and 2–2.5 mm (0.08–0.1 in) wide. The lobe on the top of the anther is gently curved forwards and reddish brown with a thin purplish band and a yellow tip. The side lobes curve upwards and have long, toothbrush-like tufts of white hairs covering their tops. The flowers only open on warm to hot sunny days and then only slowly. Flowering occurs from September to November.

== Taxonomy and naming ==
Thelymitra albiflora was first formally described in 2004 by Jeff Jeanes from a specimen collected in the Spring Gully Conservation Park and the description was published in Muelleria. The specific epithet (albiflora) means "pale-flowered".

== Distribution and habitat ==
White sun orchid grows in the higher rainfall areas of South Australia in heath, forest and woodland.
