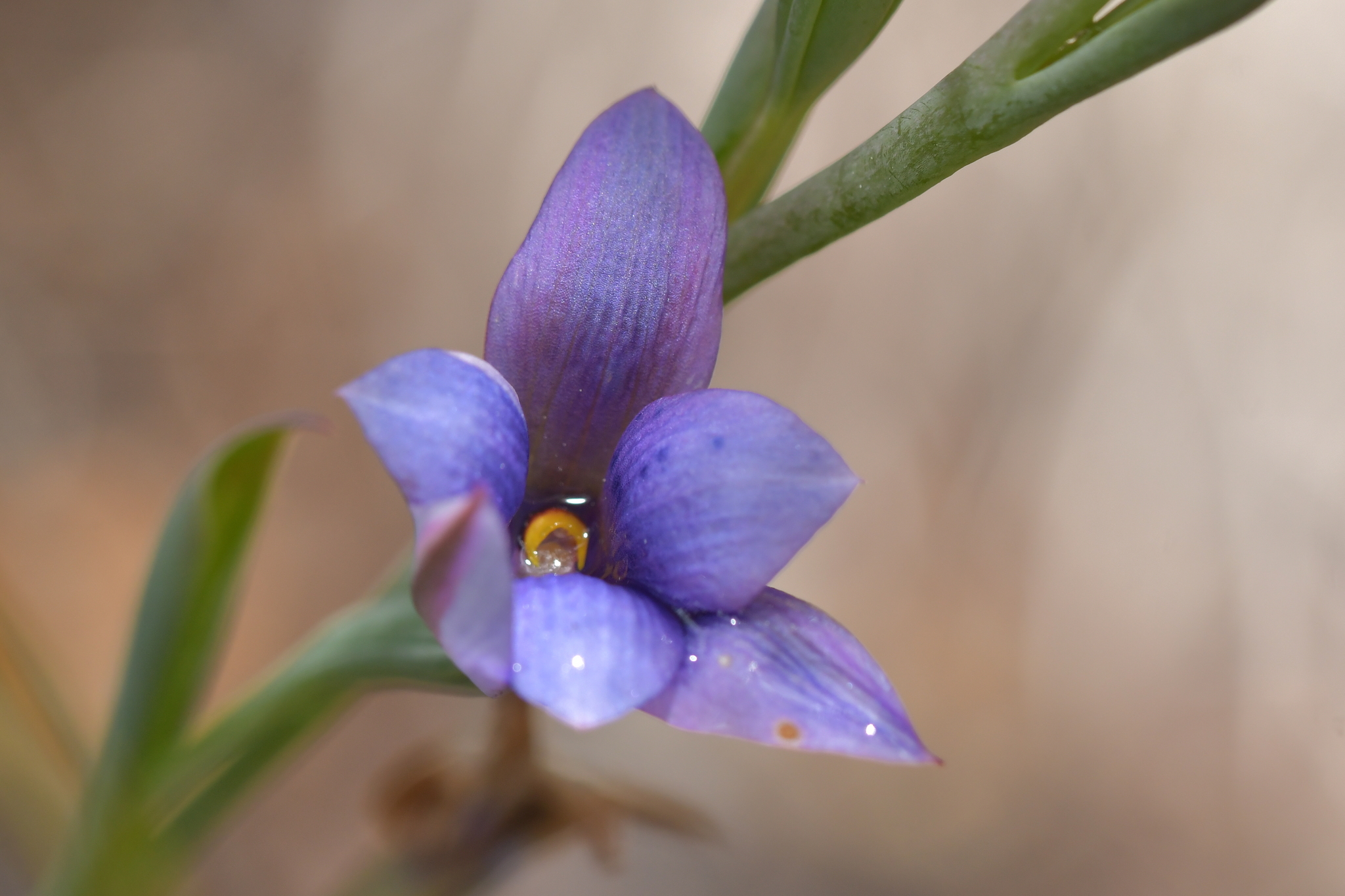

Scientific classification
- Kingdom: Plantae
- Clade: Tracheophytes
- Clade: Angiosperms
- Clade: Monocots
- Order: Asparagales
- Family: Orchidaceae
- Subfamily: Orchidoideae
- Tribe: Diurideae
- Genus: Thelymitra
- Species: T. nervosa

Binomial name
- Thelymitra nervosa Colenso

Synonyms
- Thelymitra decora Cheeseman

= Thelymitra nervosa =

Spotted sun orchid

Species of orchid

Thelymitra nervosa, commonly called spotted sun orchid, is a species of orchid in the family Orchidaceae that is endemic to New Zealand. It has a single broad, channelled leaf and up to ten blue flowers with darker spots.

== Description ==
Thelymitra nervosa is a tuberous, perennial herb with a single channelled leaf 60–200 mm (2–8 in) or more long and 8–20 mm (0.3–0.8 in) wide. Up to ten pale to dark blue, mauve, sometimes pink or white flowers usually with dark blue spots, up to 18 mm (0.7 in) wide are borne on a flowering stem sometimes up to 600 mm (20 in) tall. The column is pale pink at its base, dark purple near the top and 3–6 mm (0.1–0.2 in) long. The arms on the sides of the column have dense tufts of white hairs. The lobe on top of the anther is dark purple, curves forwards and has a yellow, horseshoe shaped top. Flowering occurs from October to February.

It is distinguished from other New Zealand Thelymitra by the rounded and cupped flower segments, the spotted (rather than striped) petals, the column arms with copious white cilia, and the horse-shoe shaped, yellow post-anther lobe. It is most similar to Thelymitra ixioides, which is one of its parent species.

== Taxonomy and naming ==
Thelymitra nervosa was first formally described in 1887 by William Colenso from a plant collected near Mount Ruapehu, and the description was published in 1888 in Transactions and Proceedings of the New Zealand Institute. The specific epithet (nervosa) is a Latin word meaning "sinewy". Colenso noted that the bracts, sepals and petals of this species are "much veined".

T. nervosa used to be referred to as T. decora.

It is believed to be an allopolyploid hybrid of T. longifolia and T. ixioides.

== Distribution and habitat ==
Spotted sun orchid grows in sunny places in forest, scrub and grassland. It is found on the North, South, Stewart and Chatham Islands.

== Ecology ==
New Zealand Thelymitra species are all capable of self-pollination, which makes up the majority of fruit production. No species in the genus provides rewards to pollinators, like nectar or edible pollen. Instead, they rely on mimicry of other brightly-coloured flowering plants to attract their pollinators. In New Zealand, Thelymitra are pollinated by native bees in the genus Leioproctus.

Thelymitra nervosa also reproduces through cloning via bulbs.
