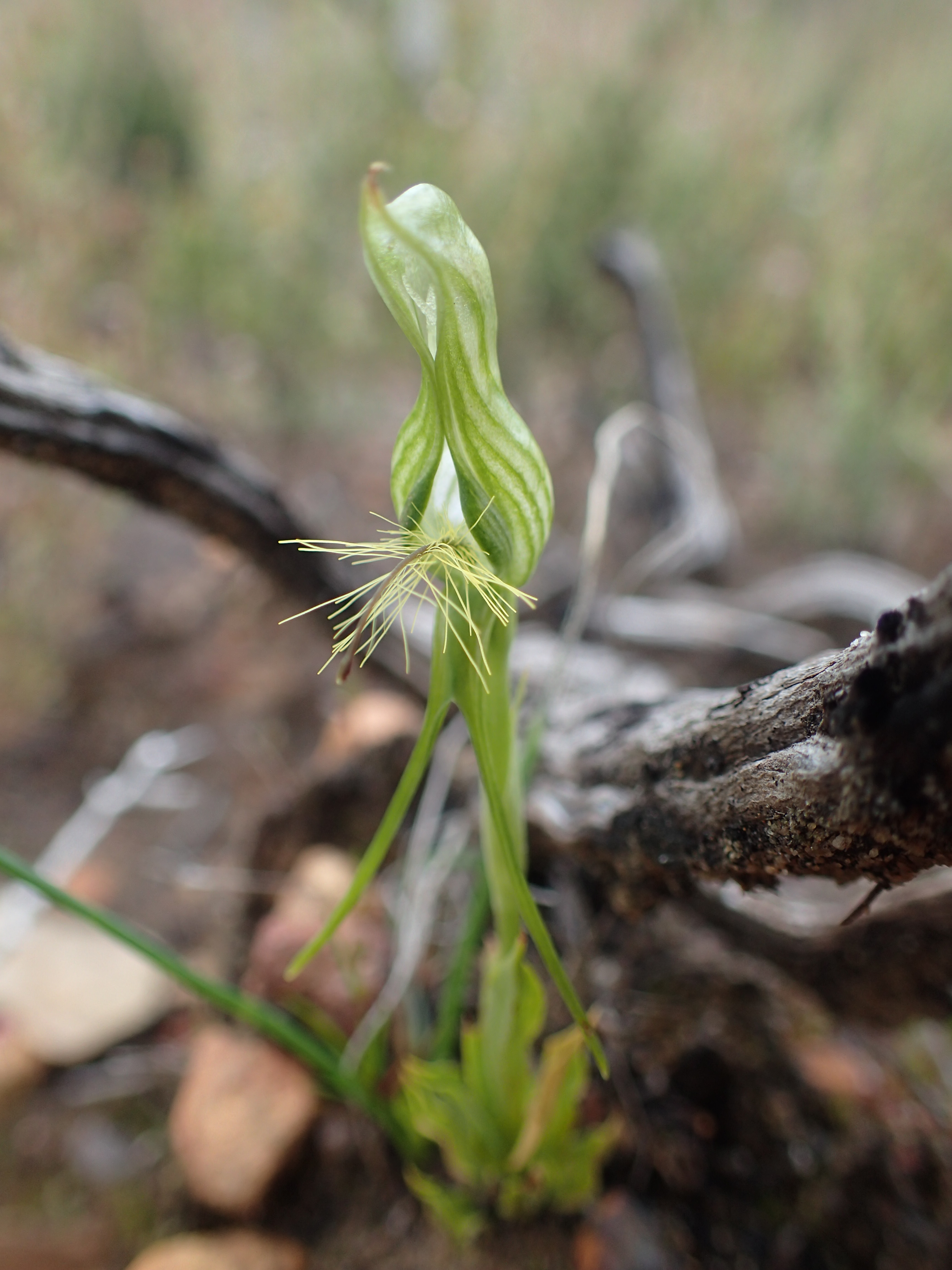
- Near Mount Chudalup

Scientific classification
- Kingdom: Plantae
- Clade: Tracheophytes
- Clade: Angiosperms
- Clade: Monocots
- Order: Asparagales
- Family: Orchidaceae
- Subfamily: Orchidoideae
- Tribe: Cranichideae
- Genus: Pterostylis
- Species: P. turfosa

Binomial name
- Pterostylis turfosa Endl.

Synonyms
- List: Plumatichilos turfosa Szlach. orth. var.; Plumatichilos turfosus (Endl.) Szlach.; Pterostylis sp. 'Esperance'; Pterostylis sp. 'Esperance'; Pterostylis sp. 'Esperance'; Pterostylis turfosa auct. non Endl.: Fitzgerald, R.D. (1885)

= Pterostylis turfosa =

Bearded bird orchid

Species of orchid

Pterostylis turfosa, commonly known as bearded bird orchid, is a species of orchid which is endemic to the south-west of Western Australia. Flowering plants have a single translucent green flower with darker green veins, on a flowering stem with up to eighteen stem leaves. It is one of a number of bearded orchids, some of which have yet to be formally described, all of which have a distinctive feather-like labellum.

== Description ==
Pterostylis turfosa is a terrestrial, perennial, deciduous, herb with an underground tuber. It has between ten and eighteen dark green leaves crowded around the base of the stem and extending upwards, the leaves 10–25 millimetres (0.4–1 in) long and 3–7 millimetres (0.1–0.3 in) wide. Flowering plants have a single translucent green flower with darker green lines, the flower 45–55 millimetres (1.8–2.2 in) long and 6–7 millimetres (0.2–0.3 in) wide arranged on a flowering stem 100–250 millimetres (4–10 in) high. The dorsal sepal and petals are fused to form a hood or "galea" over the column, the dorsal sepal with curved point 25–35 millimetres (0.98–1.4 in) long. The lateral sepals are turned downwards, joined near their bases to form a fleshy pad with tapering tips 40–50 mm (1.6–2.0 in) long and parallel to each other. The labellum is 25–30 millimetres (0.98–1.2 in) long and thread-like, bearded with yellow hairs 3–7 millimetres (0.1–0.3 in) long and ending in a thin, light brown knob. The flowers appear from September to October.

== Taxonomy and naming ==
Pterostylis turfosa was first described in 1846 by Stephan Endlicher and the description was published in the second volume of Lehmann's book Plantae Preissianae. The specific epithet (turfosa) is a Latin word meaning "peaty".

== Distribution and habitat ==
Bearded bird orchid grows in a wide variety of habitats, from shallow soil pockets on granite outcrops to forest but mainly close to the coast. It occurs between Bunbury and East Mount Barren.
