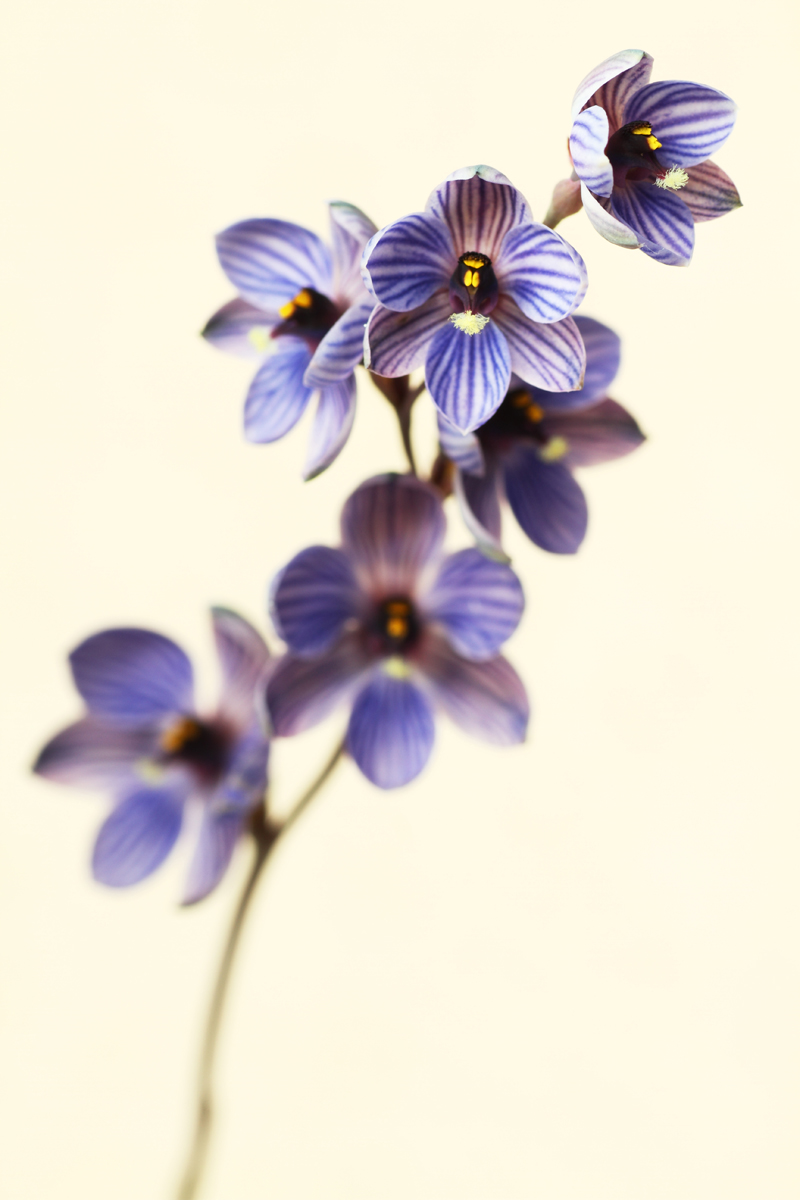
- Bell orchid (Thelymitra campanulata)

Scientific classification
- Kingdom: Plantae
- Clade: Tracheophytes
- Clade: Angiosperms
- Clade: Monocots
- Order: Asparagales
- Family: Orchidaceae
- Subfamily: Orchidoideae
- Tribe: Diurideae
- Subtribe: Thelymitrinae; Lindl., Gen. Sp. Orch. Pl.: 442. (1840)

Genera
- Calochilus; Epiblema; Thelymitra

= Thelymitrinae =

Subtribe of orchids

Thelymitrinae is an orchid subtribe in the tribe Diurideae.

== See also ==
- Taxonomy of the Orchidaceae
