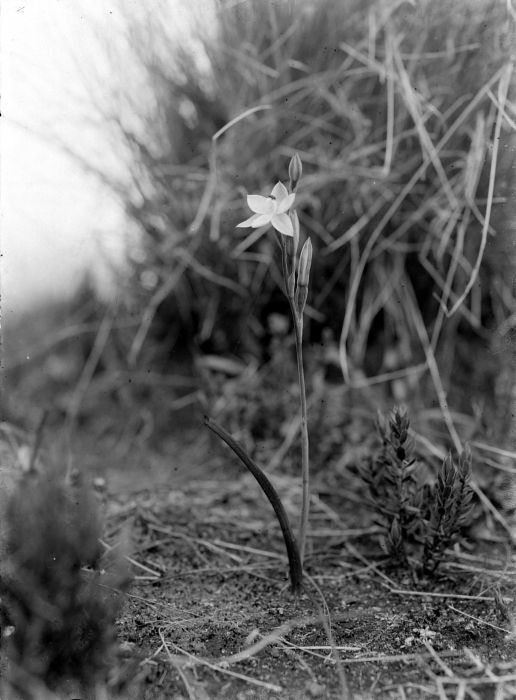
- Thelymitra javanica at the top of Mount Butak

Scientific classification
- Kingdom: Plantae
- Clade: Tracheophytes
- Clade: Angiosperms
- Clade: Monocots
- Order: Asparagales
- Family: Orchidaceae
- Subfamily: Orchidoideae
- Tribe: Diurideae
- Genus: Thelymitra
- Species: T. javanica

Binomial name
- Thelymitra javanica Blume

= Thelymitra javanica =

Species of orchid

Thelymitra javanica is a member of the family Orchidaceae.
