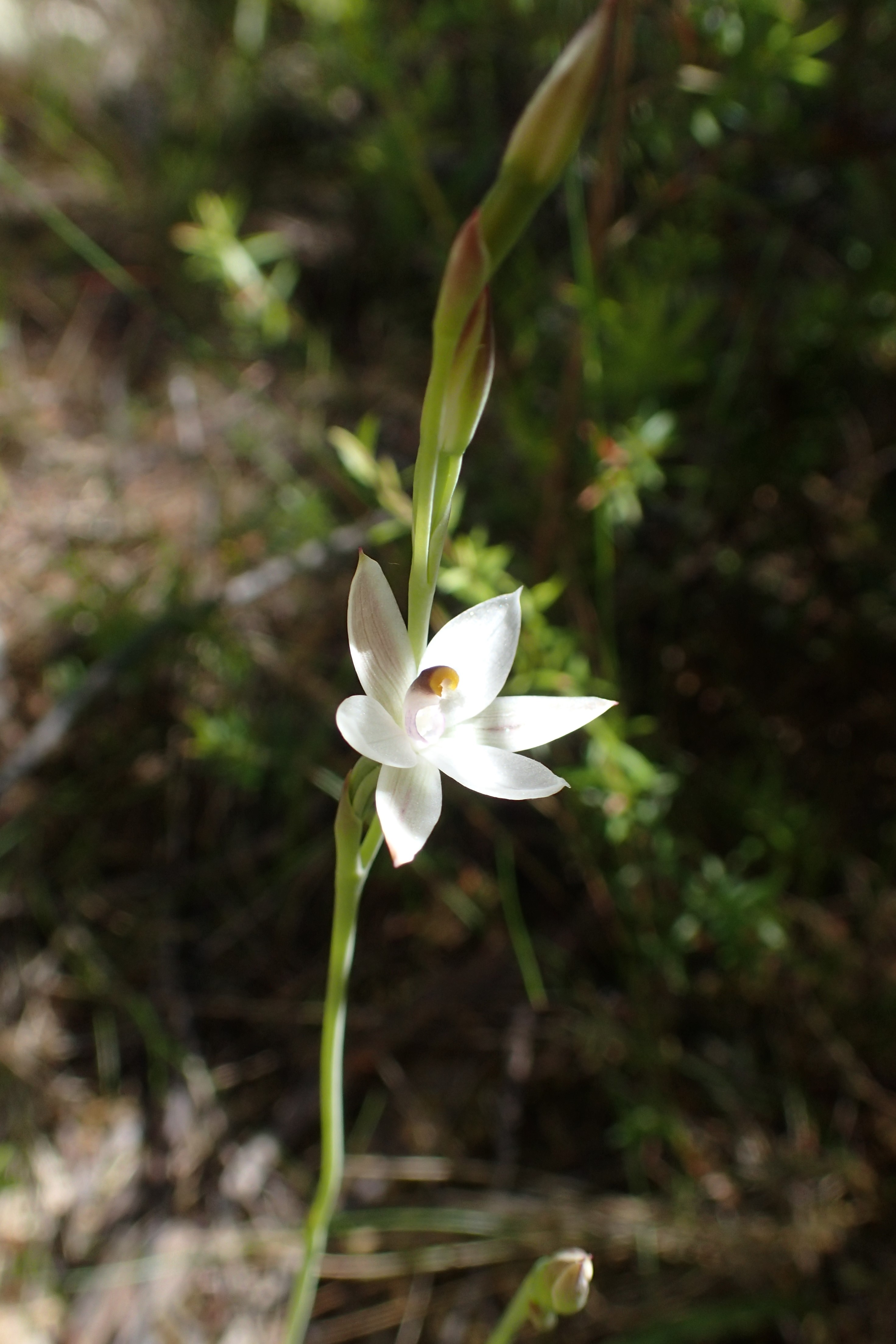
- Near Tōtaranui

Scientific classification
- Kingdom: Plantae
- Clade: Tracheophytes
- Clade: Angiosperms
- Clade: Monocots
- Order: Asparagales
- Family: Orchidaceae
- Subfamily: Orchidoideae
- Tribe: Diurideae
- Genus: Thelymitra
- Species: T. longifolia

Binomial name
- Thelymitra longifolia J.R.Forst. & G.Forst.

Synonyms
- Thelymitra cornuta Colenso

= Thelymitra longifolia =

White sun orchid

Species of orchid

Thelymitra longifolia, commonly called white sun orchid, common sun orchid or maikuku, is a species of orchid in the family Orchidaceae that is endemic to New Zealand. It was the first of a large number of similar species to be described and is therefore the type species. It has a single grass-like leaf and up to five white flowers

== Description ==
Thelymitra longifolia is a tuberous, perennial herb with a single ribbed, linear to lance-shaped leaf 50–380 mm (2–10 in) long and 10–40 mm (0.4–2 in) wide. Up to five or more white or very pale pink flowers, reddish green on the back, 8–18 mm (0.3–0.7 in) wide are borne on a flowering stem sometimes up to 1,000 mm (40 in) tall. The three sepals and three petals (including the labellum) are alike except that the dorsal sepal in slightly wider. The column is white or brown near its base but dark brown to black near its tip. The lobe on the top of the anther is usually rounded and yellow and the side lobes have dense, tangled white hairs. Flowering occurs from September to February.

== Taxonomy and naming ==
Thelymitra longifolia was first formally described in 1776 by Johann Reinhold Forster and his son Georg from a plant collected during James Cooks second voyage to the Pacific and the description was published in Characteres Generum Plantarum. The specific epithet (longifolia) is derived from the Latin words longus meaning "long" and folia meaning "leaves".

== Distribution and habitat ==
The white sun orchid usually grows in sunny places in open areas amongst scrub, but sometimes in dense forest. It is found on the North, South, Stewart, Three Kings, Chatham and Auckland Islands. It has also been reported from Norfolk Island but there is doubt that those collections match the type specimen.
