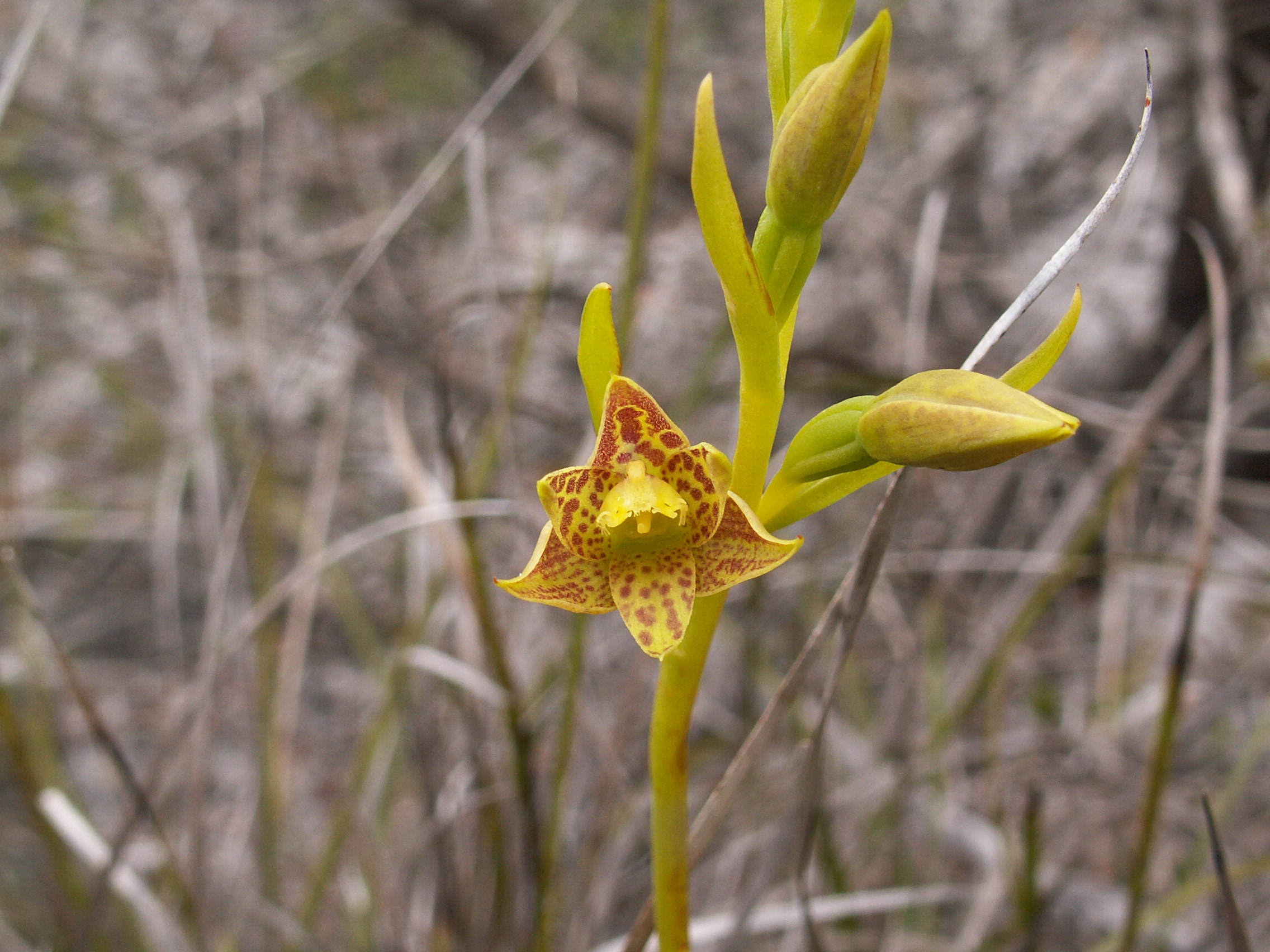
- Leopard orchid Thelymitra benthamiana near Mount Chudalup

Scientific classification
- Kingdom: Plantae
- Clade: Tracheophytes
- Clade: Angiosperms
- Clade: Monocots
- Order: Asparagales
- Family: Orchidaceae
- Subfamily: Orchidoideae
- Tribe: Diurideae
- Subtribe: Thelymitrinae
- Genus: Thelymitra; J.R.Forst. & G.Forst.

Type species
- Thelymitra longifolia J.R.Forst. & G.Forst.

Species
- List of Thelymitra species

Synonyms
- Macdonaldia Gunn ex Lindl.; Thelymitra sect. Macdonaldia (Gunn ex Lindl.) Hook.f.; Thelymitra J.R.Forst. & G.Forst. sect. Thelymitra

= Thelymitra =

Sun orchids

Genus of orchids

Thelymitra, commonly known as sun orchids, is a genus of more than 100 species of plants in the orchid family, Orchidaceae. Unlike most other orchids, sun orchids lack a highly modified labellum and all three petals are similar in size, shape and colour. The column is, however, highly modified and usually has prominent wings or glands which are helpful in identifying the species. Most sun orchids close their flowers at night, in cloudy or cool weather, giving rise to their common name. The scientific name means "woman's hood" and refers to the hooded column present in most, but not all species. Most species are endemic to Australia although some are found as far from there as the Philippines and Indonesia. The type species, Thelymitra longifolia, the first to be formally described, was collected in New Zealand.

== Description ==
Orchids in the genus Thelymitra are terrestrial, perennial, deciduous, sympodial herbs usually with a few inconspicuous, fine roots and a pair of oval-shaped tubers. A single leaf emerges from near the base of the plant and surrounds the lower part of the flowering stem.

The inflorescence is a raceme with from one to many resupinate flowers with three sepals and three petals all more or less alike in size, shape and ornamentation. (The labellum is not highly modified as in most other orchid genera but is similar to the other two petals.) The sexual parts of the flower are fused to the column which is short and stubby with wings which surround the column, forming a hood-like "mitra". The dorsal part of the mitra is usually ornamented, with a flat midsection and two side arms. The lower part of the mitra forms an unornamented rim below the column. The flowers of most species only open in bright warm sunlight and close at night or during cold or cloudy weather. A few species self pollinate and their reaction to environmental change is not as apparent. The fruit that follows flowering is a non-fleshy, dehiscent capsule containing up to 500 seeds.

== Taxonomy and naming ==
Joseph Banks collected specimens of Thelymitra longifolia on the North Island of New Zealand during Cook's first expedition to the South Pacific but the first formal description of that species was made by Johann Forster and his son Georg during Cook's second expedition to Australia. They made their collections on the South Island of New Zealand. Thelymitra longifolia is therefore the type species.

In 1803, Robert Brown collected T. venosa from Port Jackson and was the first to formally describe it in 1810.

The name "Thelymitra" is derived from the Ancient Greek words thelys meaning "belonging to women" and mitra meaning "headdress" or "turban" referring to the hooded column.

== Distribution and habitat ==
There are about 100 species distributed in higher rainfall areas of Australia, 15 in New Zealand, 11 of which are endemic, one in New Caledonia, one in East Timor and one in Java and the Philippines. Australian species grow in a range of habitats from swamps to relatively dry sandplains. They are common around granite boulders where they benefit from runoff. The New Zealand species grow in boggy places and on clay banks and T. javanica grows on sparsely vegetated mountain slopes.

== Ecology ==
The particular shape and color of the sun orchids mimics the flowers of lily family (Liliaceae) and the family Goodeniaceae, aiming by deceit for the same insect pollinators. The slender sun orchid (T. pauciflora) only opens for a short time (or not at all) and is self-pollinating. This self-pollination is a successful strategy followed by several other species such as T. circumsepta, T. graminea , T. holmesii and T. mucida.

== Conservation ==
Several species are considered by the IUCN as endangered (T. epipactoides) or critically endangered (T. gregaria, T. hiemalis and T. × mackibbinii).

== Use in horticulture ==
Thelymitras can be grown in a freely draining, dense mixture with partially composted organic matter. A suitable mixture is an equal mix of 7 mm road screenings, year old composted wood chips and commercial potting mix. It is good practice to cover the surface in pine or she-oak needles to control water loss and to feed the mycorrhizal fungi that support the orchid. Due to the buds only opening in warm weather, it is common practice to induce flowering by using a bank of strong incandescent lights to simulate the warm sun. Some work has gone into growing hybrids for better growing and more colour.

== Species ==
See List of Thelymitra species

=== Gallery ===
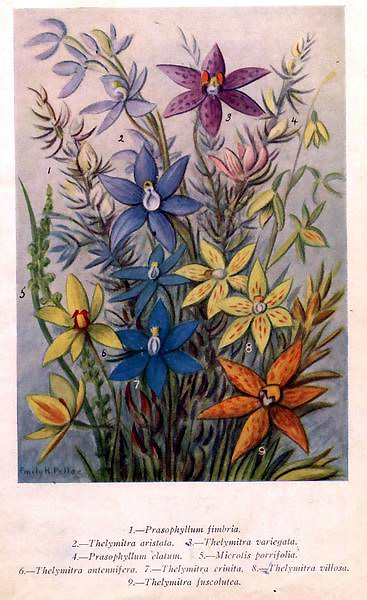
Several Thelymitra species :2, 3, 6, 7, 8, 9

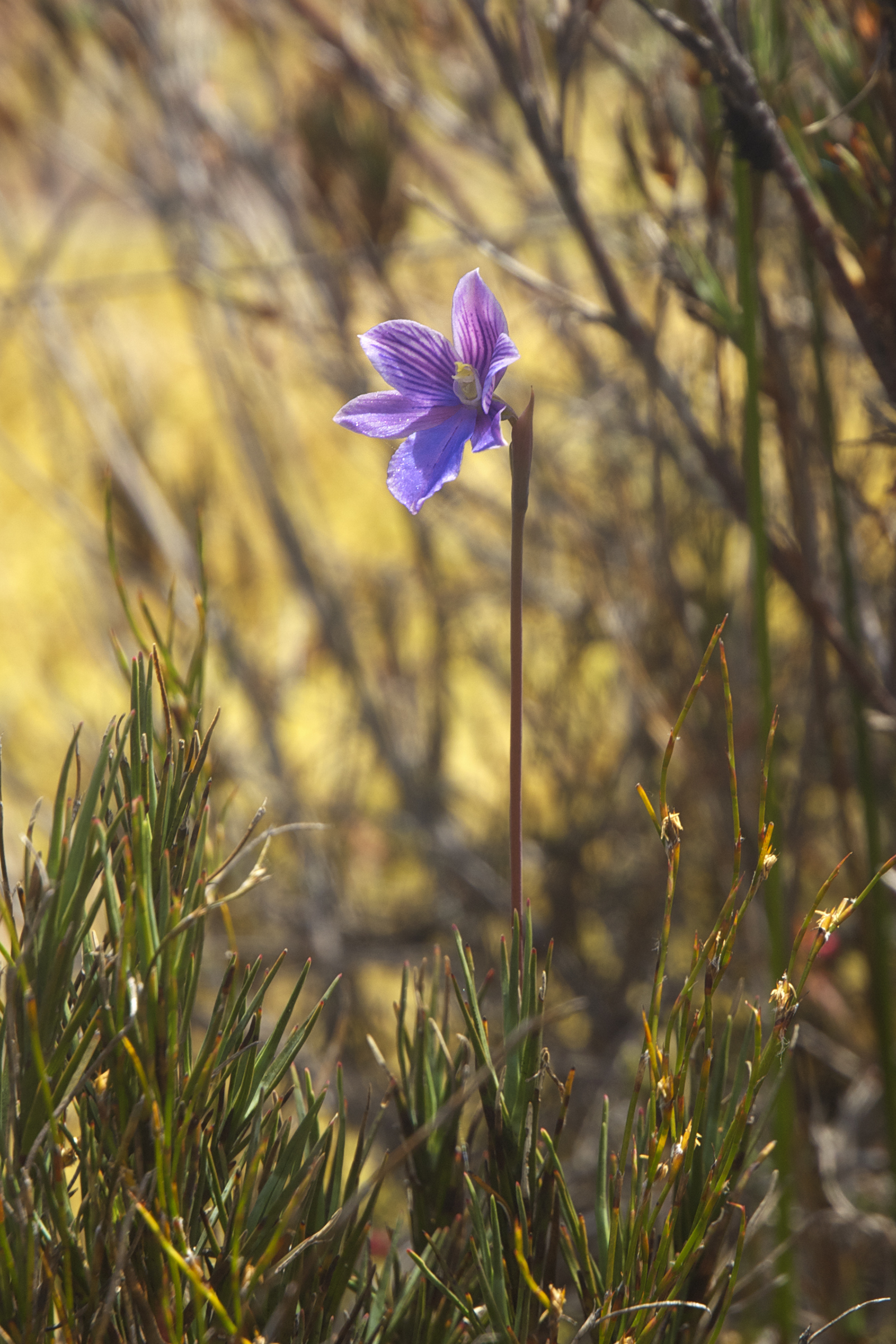
Swamp sun orchid (Thelymitra cyanea)

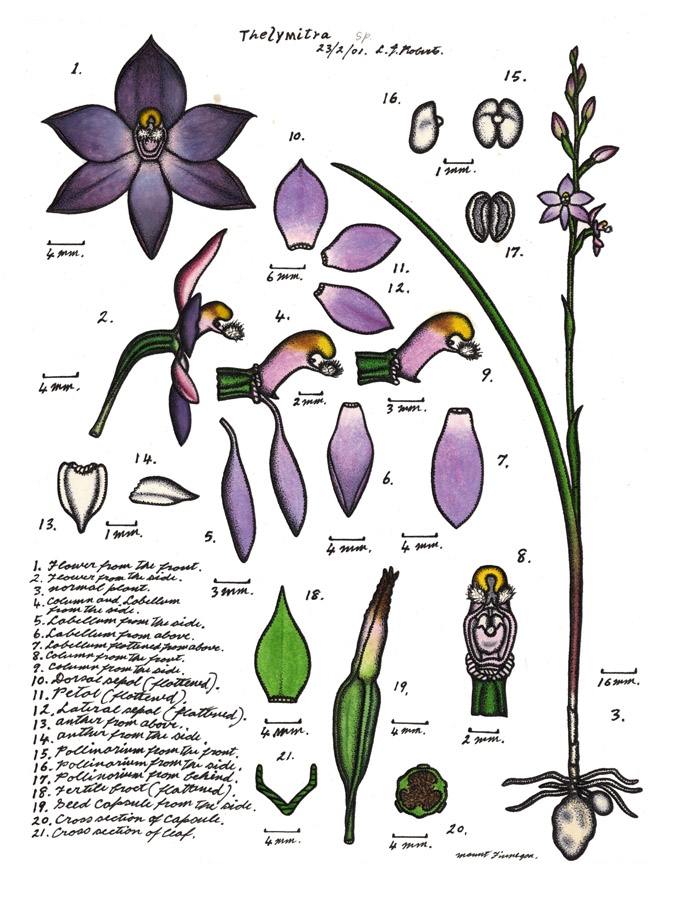
Thelymitra species by Lewis Roberts.

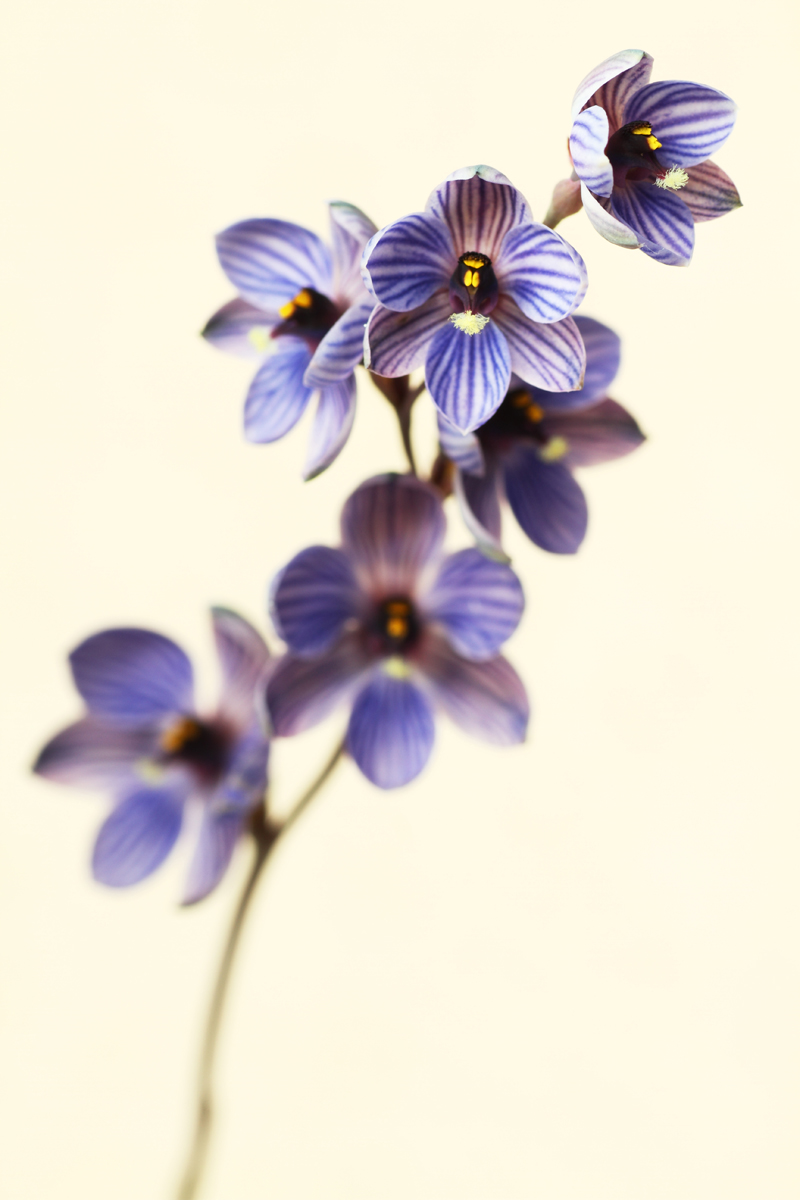
Bell orchid (Thelymitra campanulata)

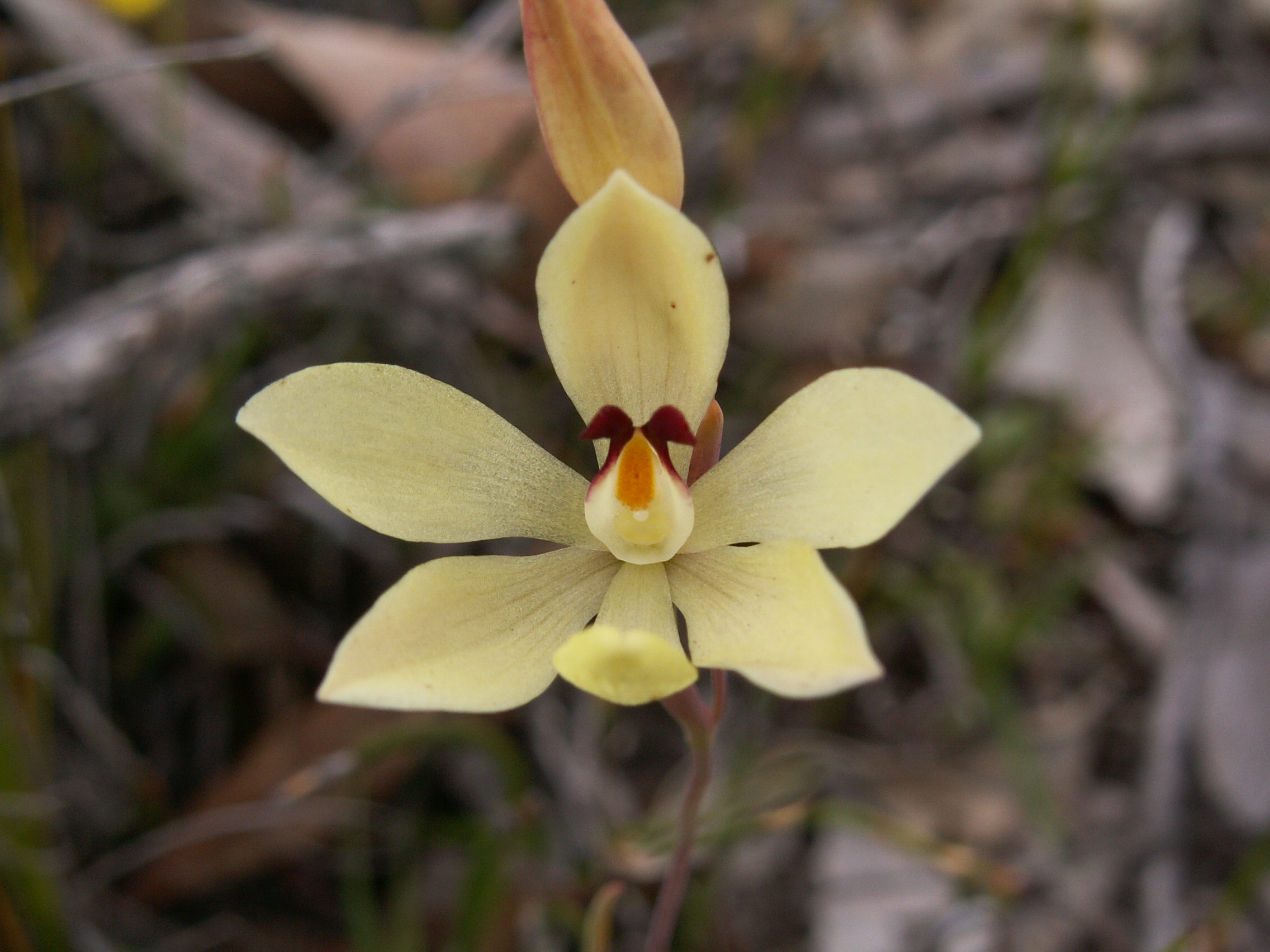
Thelymitra antennifera in the Stirling Range National Park

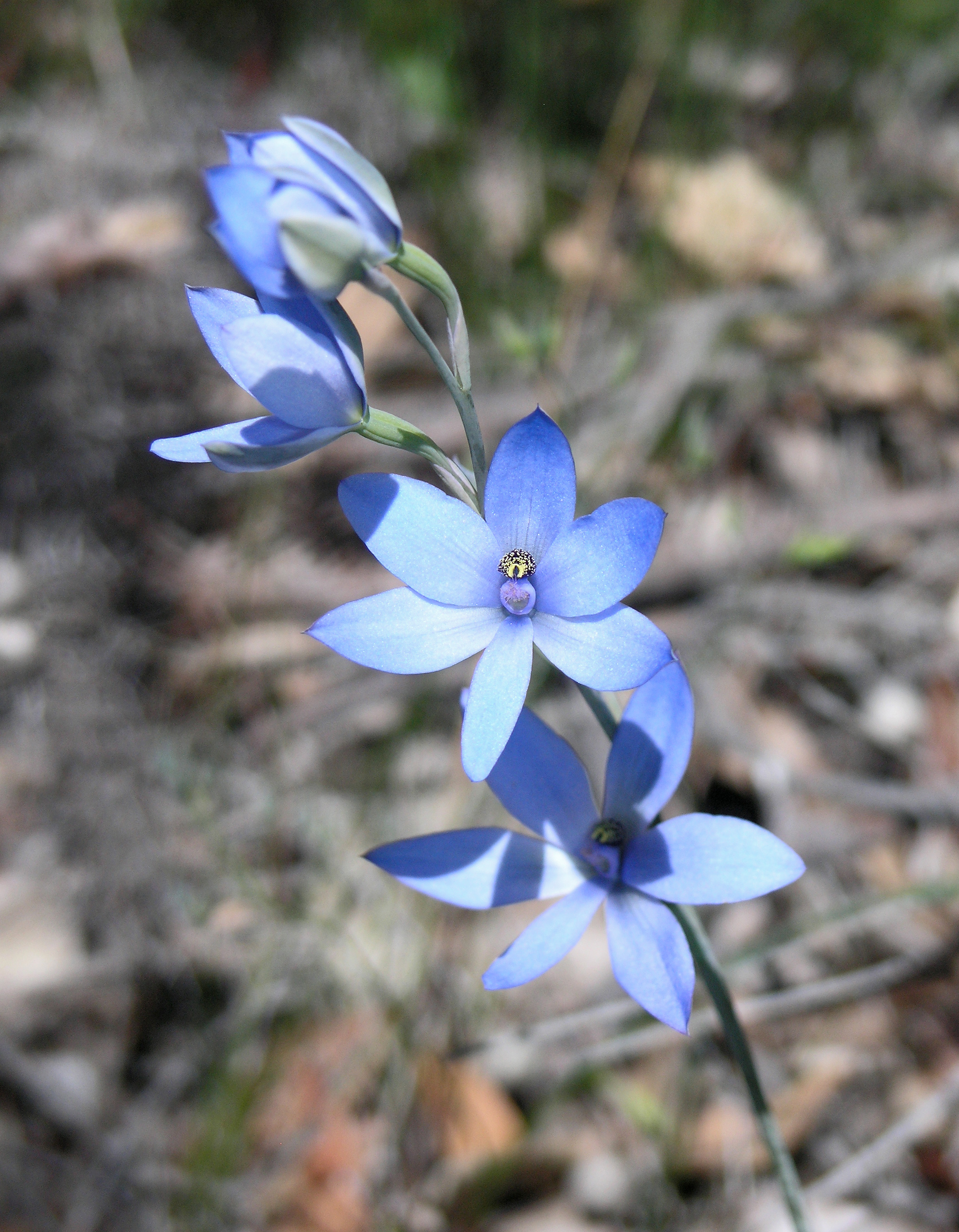
Thelymitra crinita near Jarrahdale

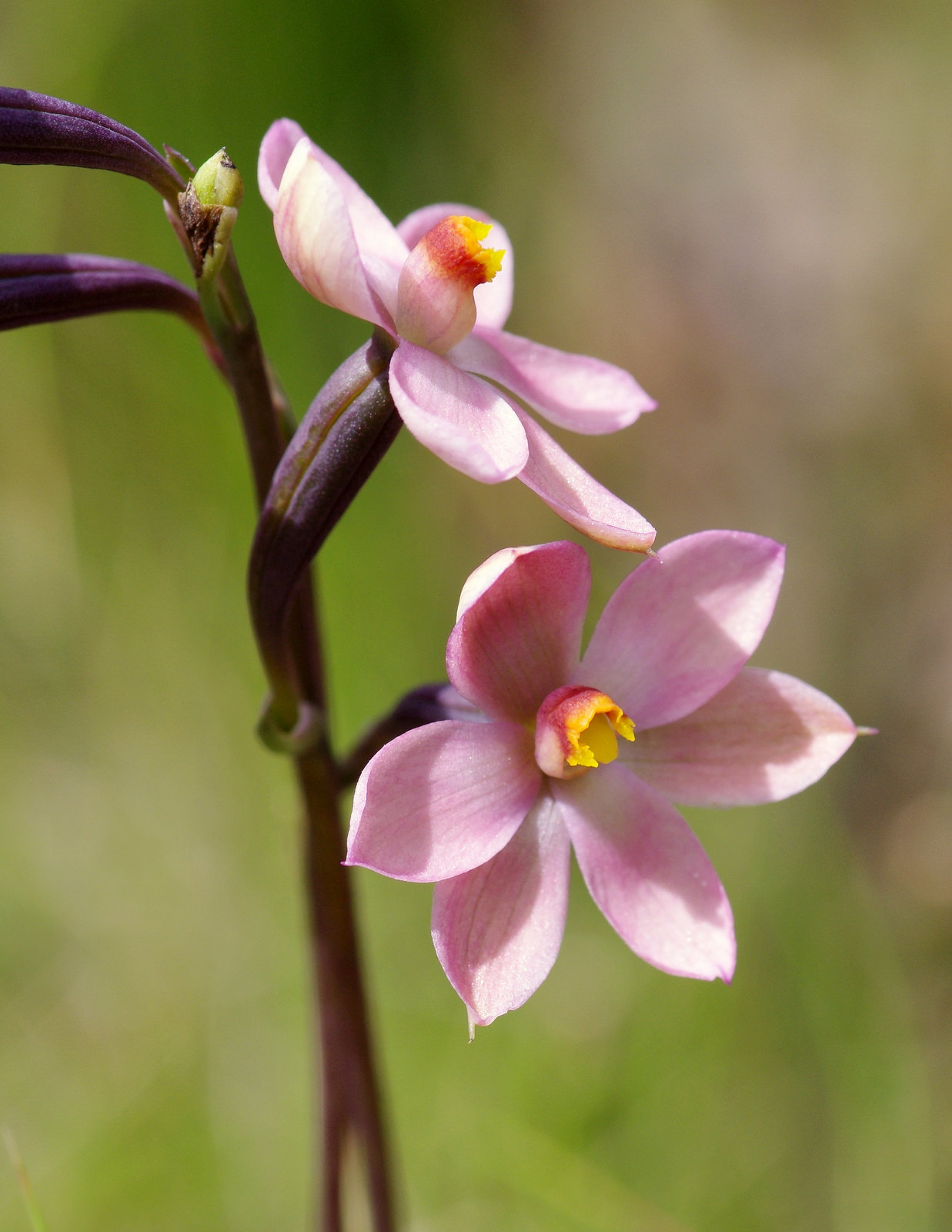
Thelymitra rubra

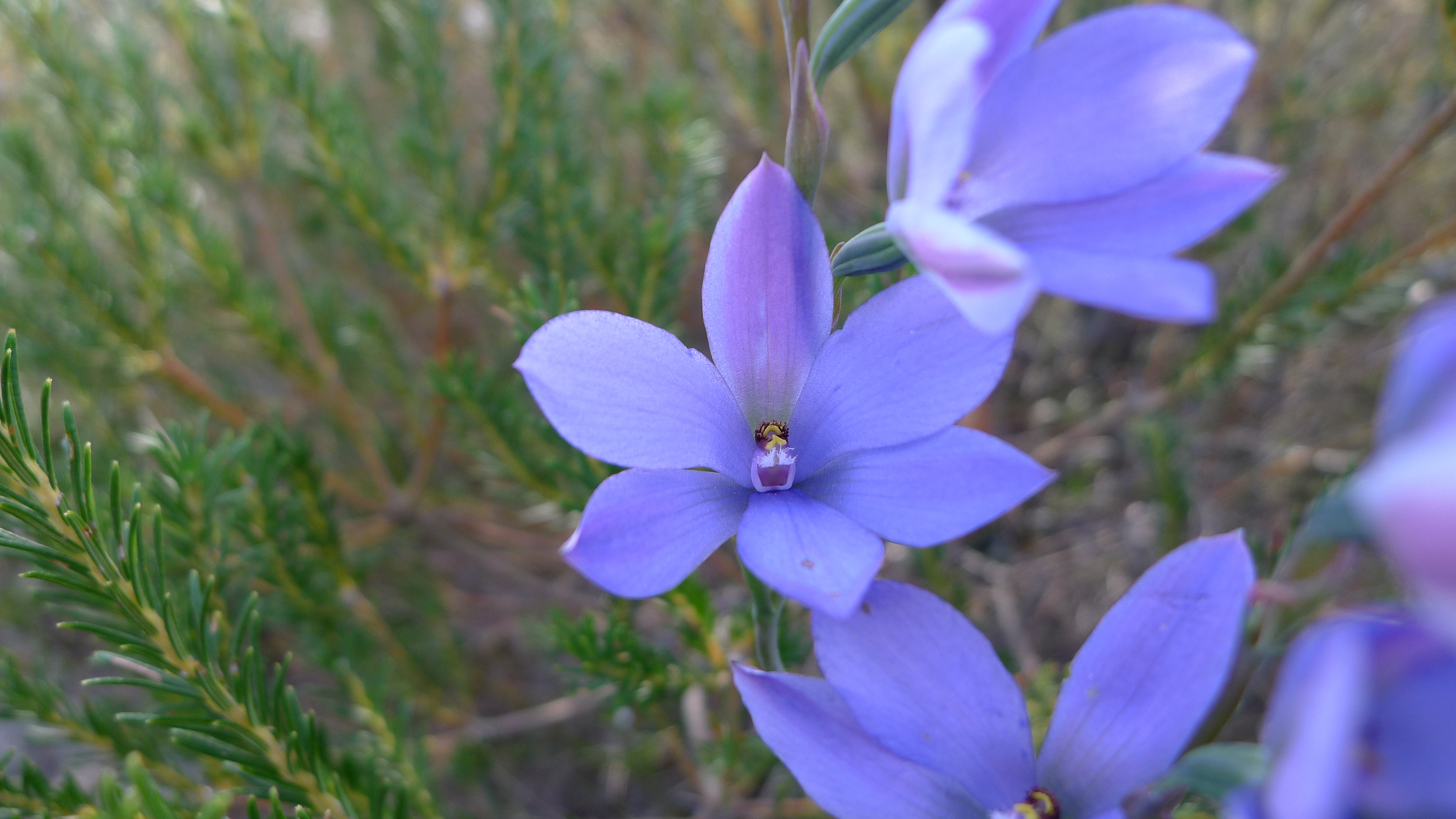
Thelymitra ixioides in the Royal National Park
