= Mount Chudalup =

Granite outcrop in Western Australia

Coordinates: 34.7647°S 116.0866°E

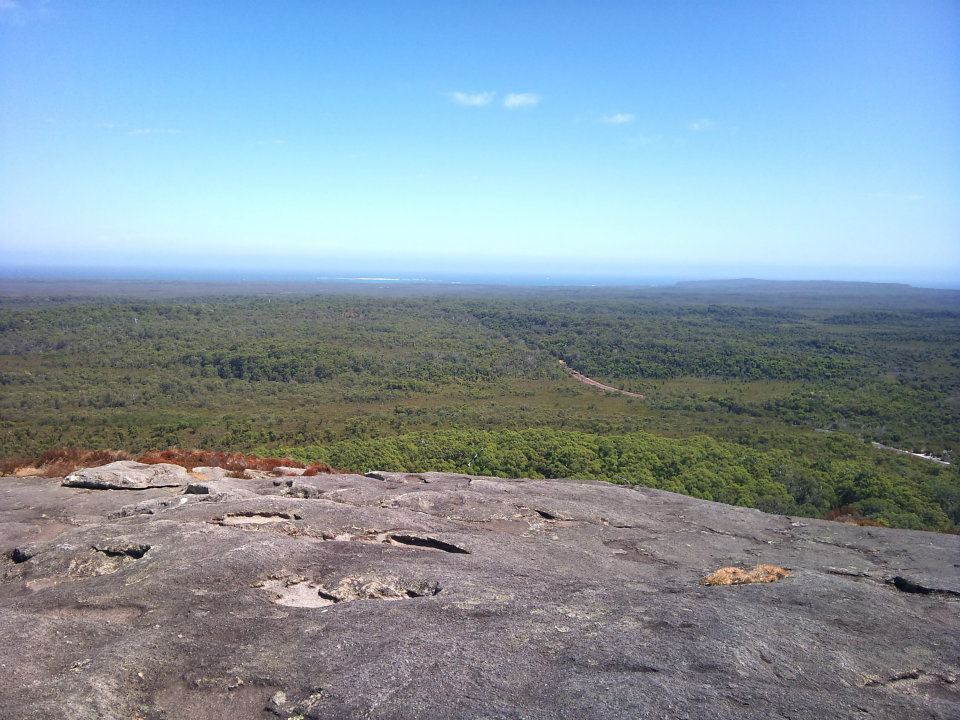
Mount Chudalup

Mount Chudalup is a 187 m (614 ft) high granite outcrop in the D'Entrecasteaux National Park, on the way to Windy Harbour from Northcliffe, in Western Australia. As a significant feature on the Windy Harbour road, it was named Big Chudalup in the 1940s. Earlier in the 1920s it had been referred to as Chudalup Rock.
