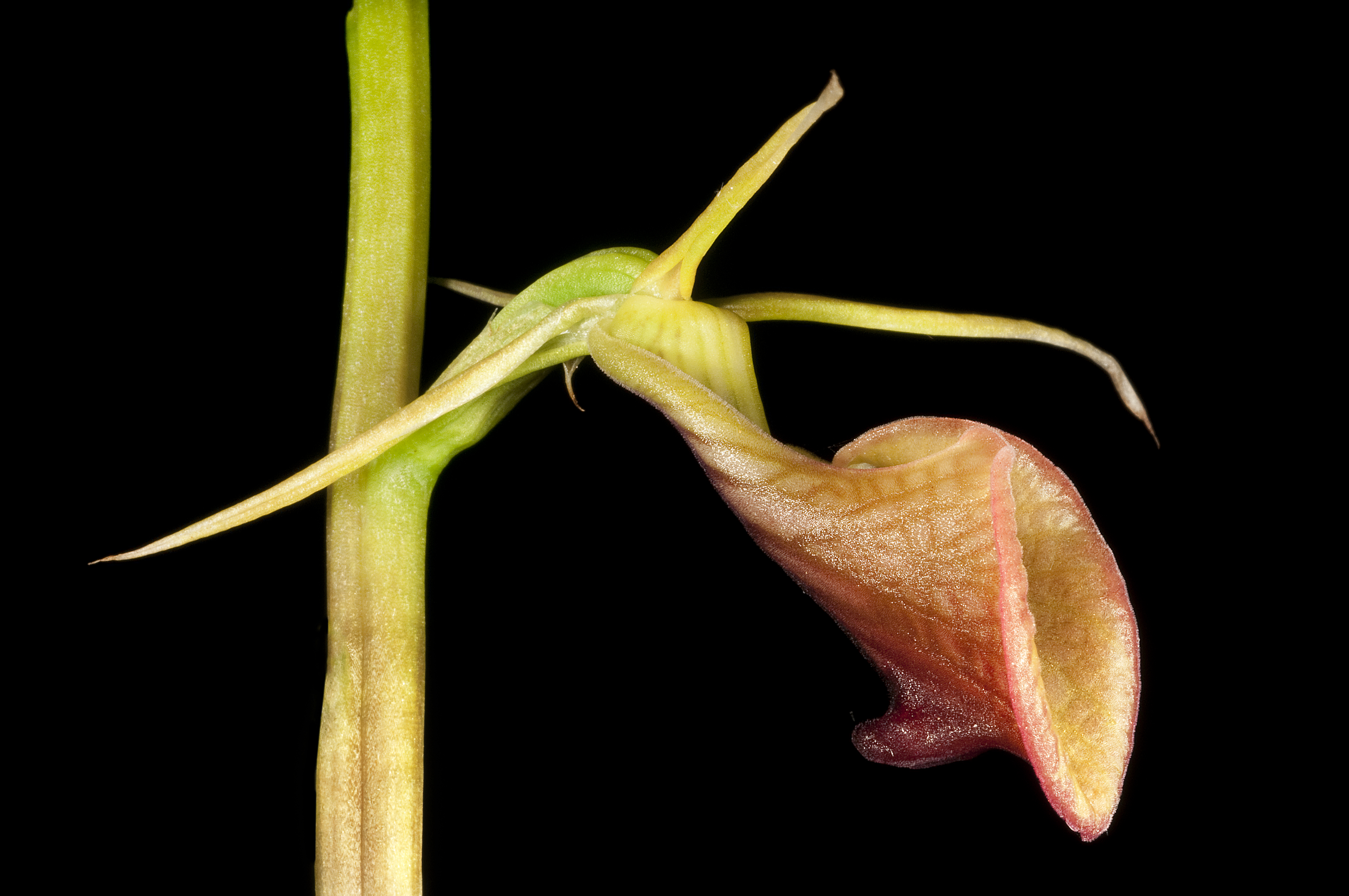
- Cryptostylis ovata flower

Scientific classification
- Kingdom: Plantae
- Clade: Tracheophytes
- Clade: Angiosperms
- Clade: Monocots
- Order: Asparagales
- Family: Orchidaceae
- Subfamily: Orchidoideae
- Tribe: Diurideae
- Subtribe: Cryptostylidinae; Schltr.

Genera
- Coilochilus; Cryptostylis

Diversity
- 24 species, see text

= Cryptostylidinae =

Subtribe of orchids

Cryptostylidinae is a subtribe of the orchid tribe Diurideae. Members of this subtribe are found in Australasia, the Pacific Islands, and tropical Asia.

== Classification ==
This subtribe includes the following genera and species:

- Coilochilus Schltr.
  - C. neocaledonicum Schltr.
- Cryptostylis R.Br.
  - C. acutata J.J.Sm.
  - C. apiculata J.J.Sm.
  - C. arachnites (Blume) Hassk.
  - C. arfakensis J.J.Sm.
  - C. carinata J.J.Sm.
  - C. clemensii (Ames & C.Schweinf.) J.J.Sm
  - C. concava Schltr.
  - C. conspicua J.J.Sm.
  - C. erecta R.Br.
  - C. filiformis Blume
  - C. gracilis Schltr.
  - C. hamadryas Schltr.
  - C. hunteriana Nicholls
  - C. javanica J.J.Sm.
  - C. lancilabris Schltr.
  - C. leptochila F.Muell. ex Benth.
  - C. ligulata J.J.Sm.
  - C. maculata (J.J.Sm.) J.J.Sm.
  - C. ovata R.Br.
  - C. sigmoidea J.J.Sm.
  - C. sororia Schltr.
  - C. subulata (Labill.) Rchb.f.
  - C. taiwaniana Masam.

== See also ==
- Taxonomy of the Orchidaceae
