= Spider flower =

Spider flower may refer to plant species within the genus Cleome including:

- Cleome hassleriana

It may also refer to plant species within the genus Grevillea from Australia including:

- Grevillea albiflora, also known as white spider flower
- Grevillea buxifolia, also known as grey spider flower
- Grevillea mucronulata, also known as green spider flower
- Grevillea oleoides, also known as red spider flower
- Grevillea sericea, also known as pink spider flower
- Grevillea speciosa, also known as red spider flower
