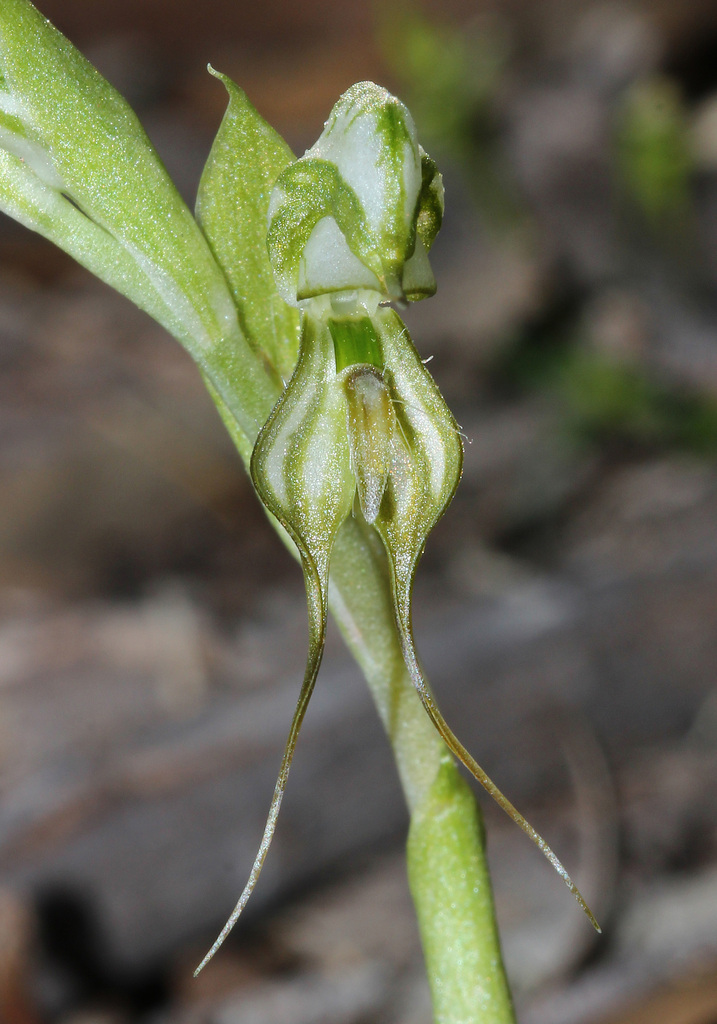

Scientific classification
- Kingdom: Plantae
- Clade: Tracheophytes
- Clade: Angiosperms
- Clade: Monocots
- Order: Asparagales
- Family: Orchidaceae
- Subfamily: Orchidoideae
- Tribe: Cranichideae
- Genus: Pterostylis
- Species: P. simulans

Binomial name
- Pterostylis simulans R.J.Bates

= Pterostylis simulans =

Species of orchid

Pterostylis simulans is a species of orchid which is endemic to South Australia.

It was first described in 2014 by Robert John Bates. The species epithet, simulans, refers to the orchid's similarity to both the taller Pterostylis excelsa and to the more delicate P. cobarensis.
