= C. leptochila =

C. leptochila may refer to:

- Caladenia leptochila, a spider orchid
- Canna leptochila, a garden plant
- Cryptostylis leptochila, a tongue orchid
