= Red spider flower =

Red spider flower is a common name for several plants and may refer to:

- Grevillea oleoides
- Grevillea speciosa
