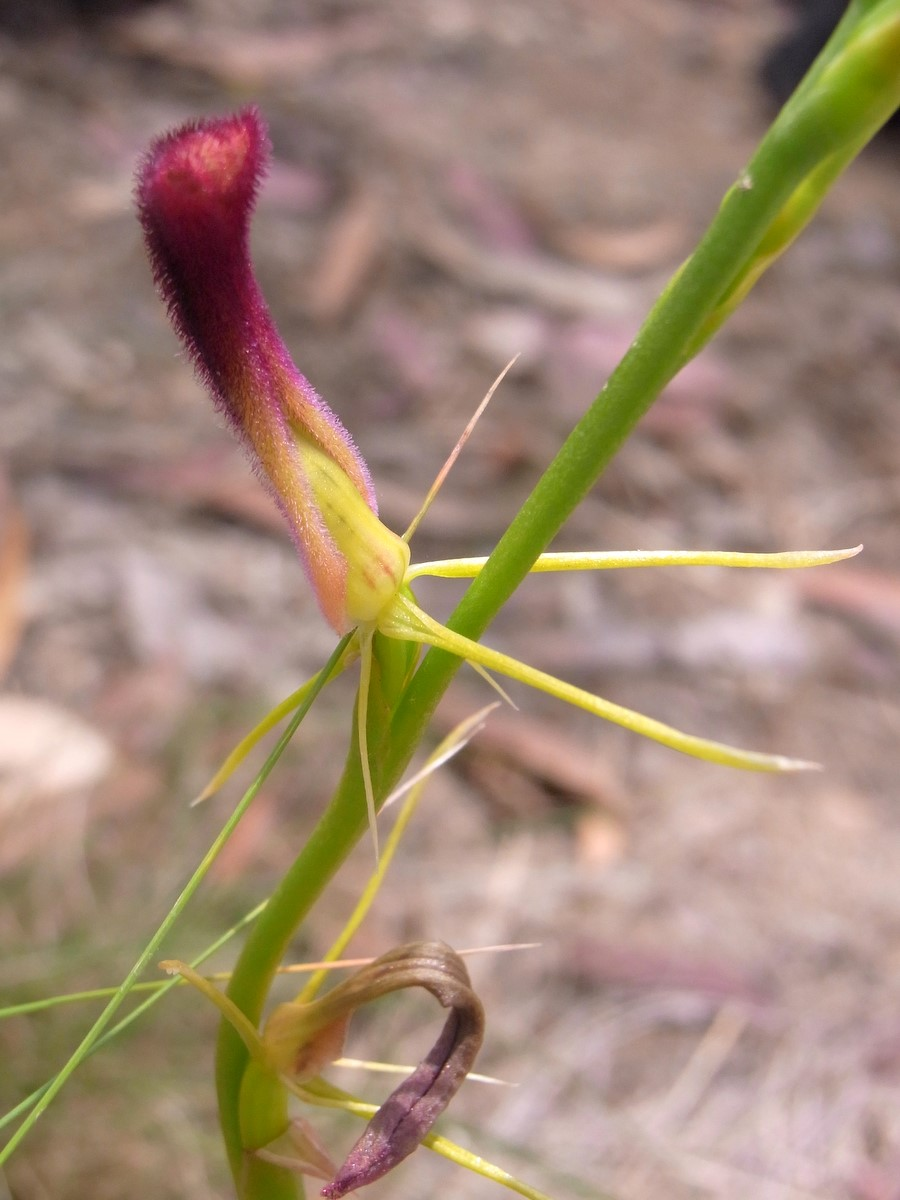
- In Ku-ring-gai Chase National Park, Australia

Conservation status
- Vulnerable (EPBC Act)

Scientific classification
- Kingdom: Plantae
- Clade: Embryophytes
- Clade: Tracheophytes
- Clade: Spermatophytes
- Clade: Angiosperms
- Clade: Monocots
- Order: Asparagales
- Family: Orchidaceae
- Subfamily: Orchidoideae
- Tribe: Diurideae
- Genus: Cryptostylis
- Species: C. hunteriana

Binomial name
- Cryptostylis hunteriana Nicholls

= Cryptostylis hunteriana =

Leafless tongue-orchid

Species of orchid

Cryptostylis hunteriana, commonly known as the leafless tongue-orchid is a flowering plant in the orchid family Orchidaceae and is endemic to south eastern Australia. It is leafless but has up to ten green flowers with a more or less erect, dark reddish brown labellum.

== Description ==
Cryptostylis hunteriana is a terrestrial, perennial, deciduous, saprophytic herb. Up to ten flowers 20–30 mm (0.79–1.2 in) long and 6–8 mm (0.2–0.3 in) wide are borne on a flowering stem 80–450 mm (3–20 in) high. The most prominent feature of the flower is its spatula-shaped labellum which is red or maroon with a green base, and is distinctly hairy. The labellum is 20–33 mm (0.8–1 in) long and 6–8 mm (0.2–0.3 in) wide with inrolled margins and a smooth underside. Thin green sepals measuring 15–22 mm (0.6–0.9 in) in length and about 1 mm (0.04 in) wide arise from its base. The petals are similar to the sepals but shorter and narrower. Flowering mainly occurs from December to February.

== Taxonomy and naming ==
Cryptostylis hunteriana was first formally described in 1938 by William Henry Nicholls from a specimen collected near Marlo by William Hunter (1893–1971), a surveyor from Bairnsdale. The description was published in The Victorian Naturalist. The specific epithet (hunteriana) honours the collector of the type specimen.

== Distribution and habitat ==
The leafless tongue-orchid grows singly or in small colonies in a range of habitats including wet heath and sedgeland, on grasstree plains and in woodland with scribbly gum, silvertop ash, red bloodwood and black sheoak. It often grows near the other tongue-orchids C. subulata and C. erecta. The species is found in coastal areas and nearby ranges south from the Gibraltar Range National Park in New South Wales to East Gippsland between Marlo and Genoa in Victoria. In Queensland it has been recorded from the coast at Tin Can Bay to the Glass House Mountains.

== Ecology ==
Like other Australian members of its genus, C. hunteriana is pollinated by the ichneumon wasp known as the orchid dupe wasp (Lissopimpla excelsa), the males of which mistake the flower parts for female wasps and copulate with it. Unlike other members of the genus, it lacks a leaf and is instead thought to have a relationship with a fungus for its metabolism.

== Conservation ==
The total population of C. hunteriana is estimated to be between 1300 and 1500 plants in New South Wales and several hundred in Victoria. The main threat to the species is habitat loss due to housing development and road construction. It has been classified as vulnerable under the Australian Government Environment Protection and Biodiversity Conservation Act 1999 and the New South Wales Biodiversity Conservation Act 2016. In Victoria it is listed as "endangered" under the Flora and Fauna Guarantee Act 1988.
