= White spider =

White spider or variation, may refer to:

- The White Spider (1963 film) (German: Die weiße Spinne) West German crime drama film
- The White Spider (1927 film) (German: Die weiße Spinne) German silent film
- White Spider (2005 song), a song by Anthony Phillips from the album Field Day (Anthony Phillips album)
- The White Spider (1959 book) (German: Die Weisse Spinne) non-fiction Swiss mountaineering book about the first successful climb of the North Face of the Eiger
- The White Spider, an icefield on the north face of the Swiss mountain Eiger
- White spider flower (Grevillea albiflora) an Australian shrub
- White spider lily (Lycoris albiflora) a flower species of lily genus Lycoris (plant)
- White spider orchid (Caladenia longicauda) an Australian orchid
- Caladenia rigida (white spider-orchid) an Australian orchid
- White Spider (cocktail), the vodka variation of the Stinger (cocktail)
- White Spider Demon (character), a fictional character from the 2002 TV series The Monkey King: Quest for the Sutra
- The White Spider (character), a fictional character from the 1921 Western film serial The White Horseman

== See also ==
- White-tailed spider, Australian spiders of genus Lampona and species cylindrata and murina
- White Lady (spider) (Leucorchestris arenicola)
- White (disambiguation)
- Spider (disambiguation)
