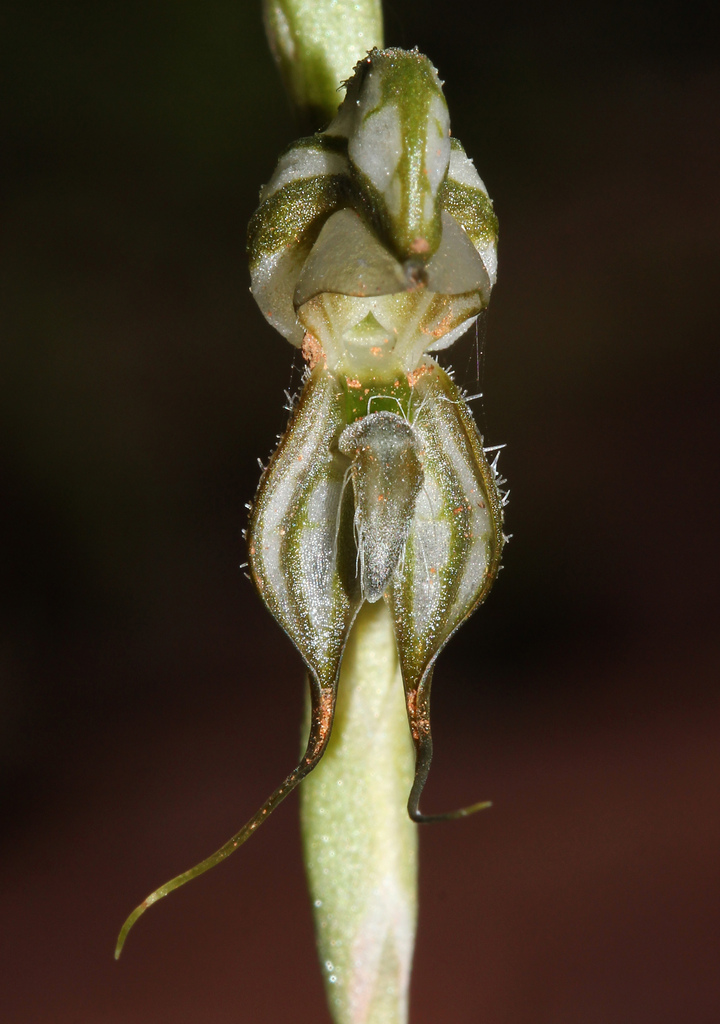

Scientific classification
- Kingdom: Plantae
- Clade: Tracheophytes
- Clade: Angiosperms
- Clade: Monocots
- Order: Asparagales
- Family: Orchidaceae
- Subfamily: Orchidoideae
- Tribe: Cranichideae
- Genus: Pterostylis
- Species: P. bracteata

Binomial name
- Pterostylis bracteata (D.L.Jones & R.J.Bates) J.M.H.Shaw

Synonyms
- Oligochaetochilus bracteatus D.L.Jones & R.J.Bates

= Pterostylis bracteata =

Species of orchid

Pterostylis bracteata is a species of flowering plant in the orchid family Orchidaceae and is endemic to the northern Flinders Ranges in South Australia. It has a rosette of leaves at its base and 2 to 5 translucent white flowers with prominent maroon or lead-coloured markings with a green insect-like labellum with bristly hairs.

== Description ==
Pterostylis bracteata is a terrestrial, perennial, deciduous, herb with an underground tuber and that often grows in clumps. It has a rosette of between 5 and 9 overlapping egg-shaped to elliptical leaves at the base, but are usually withered before flowering. The leaves are 12–15 mm (0.47–0.59 in) long, 4–7 mm (0.16–0.28 in) wide and finely wrinkled. Two to five translucent white, green and maroon or lead-coloured flowers are borne on a flowering stem 150–200 mm (5.9–7.9 in) tall, each flower on a curved pedicel about 5 mm (0.20 in) long with papery bracts 10–12 mm (0.39–0.47 in) long at the base. The dorsal sepal and petals form a hood or "galea" over the column with the dorsal sepal forming a hood 8–10 mm (0.31–0.39 in) long and about 4 mm (0.16 in) wide. The lateral sepals turn downwards, as wide as the galea 10 mm (0.39 in) long and 4 mm (0.16 in) wide which narrow to thread-like tips 5–8 mm (0.20–0.31 in) long, curved forward and spread apart from each other. The labellum is dark maroon to black and insect-like, about 5 mm (0.20 in) long and 1.2 mm (0.047 in) wide and covered with hairs up to 5 mm (0.20 in) long. Flowering occurs in late September and October.

== Taxonomy and naming ==
This species was first formally described in 2017 by David Jones and Robert Bates who gave it the name Oligochaetochilus bracteatus, from a specimen collected by Bates in the southern Flinders Ranges in 2013 and the description was published in Australian Orchid Review. In 2019, Julian Shaw transferred the species to the genus Pterostylis as P. bracteata. The specific epithet (bracteata) means "bracteate" or "bearing bracts", referring to the many stem-clasping bracts on the flowering stem.

== Distribution and habitat ==
Pterostylis bracteata grows under river red gums (Eucalyptus camaldulensis) and native pines in the northern Flinders Ranges of South Australia.
