= Pterostylis viriosa =

Adelaide Hills banded greenhood

Scientific classification
- Kingdom: Plantae
- Clade: Tracheophytes
- Clade: Angiosperms
- Clade: Monocots
- Order: Asparagales
- Family: Orchidaceae
- Subfamily: Orchidoideae
- Tribe: Cranichideae
- Genus: Pterostylis
- Species: P. viriosa

Binomial name
- Pterostylis viriosa (D.L.Jones) R.J.Bates<

Synonyms
- Bunochilus viriosus D.L.Jones

Species of orchid

Pterostylis viriosa, commonly known as the Adelaide Hills banded greenhood, is a plant in the orchid family Orchidaceae and is endemic to South Australia. Flowering plants have up several green flowers with faint white stripes. The flowers have an insect-like labellum which is green with a dark green mound on its upper end. Non-flowering plants have a rosette of leaves on a stalk, but flowering plants lack the rosette, instead having several stem leaves.

== Description ==
Pterostylis viriosa, is a terrestrial, perennial, deciduous, herb with an underground tuber. Non-flowering plants have a rosette of leaves on a short stalk. Flowering plants have up to several green flowers with faint white stripes on a flowering spike up to 800 mm (30 in) high. The flowering spike lacks a rosett but has a small number of stem leaves. The dorsal sepal and petals are fused, forming a hood or "galea" over the column. The petals have a wide, transparent flange on their outer edges. The lateral sepals turn downwards and are joined for most of their length before tapering to triangular tips. The labellum is insect-like and hairy with a dark green mound on the "head" end and a dark green mid-line. Flowering occurs from late July to early September.

== Taxonomy and naming ==
This greenhood was first formally described in 2006 by David Jones and given the name Bunochilus viriosus. The description was published in Australian Orchid Research from a specimen collected in the Belair National Park. In 2008 Robert Bates changed the name to Pterostylis viriosa. The specific epithet (viriosa) is a Latin word meaning "robust" or "strong", referring to the robust nature of this orchid and to its large flowers.

== Distribution ==
The Adelaide Hills banded greenhood occurs in the Fleurieu (KAN02), Mount Lofty Ranges (FLB01), Central Flinders (FLB06) and Talia (EYB04) biogeographic regions of South Australia.
