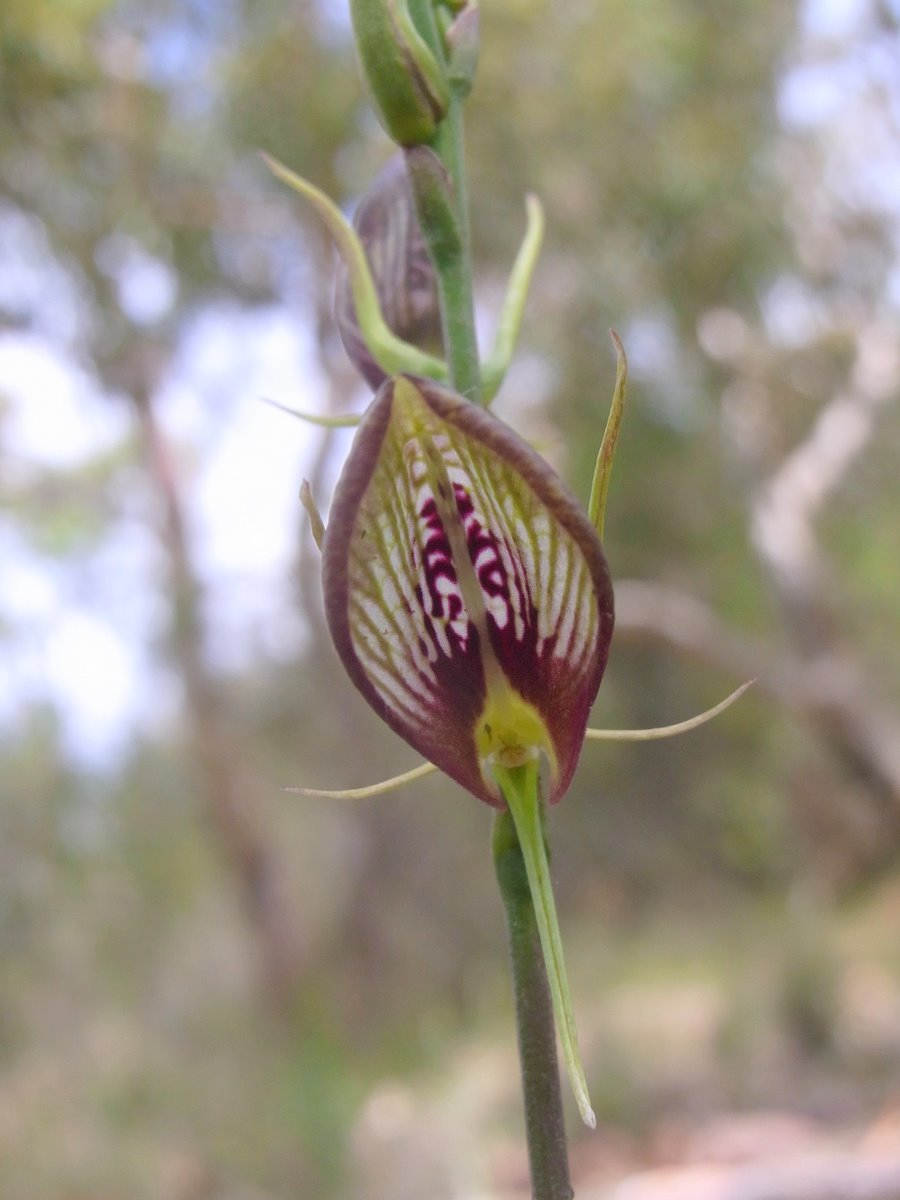
- Cryptostylis erecta

Scientific classification
- Kingdom: Plantae
- Clade: Tracheophytes
- Clade: Angiosperms
- Clade: Monocots
- Order: Asparagales
- Family: Orchidaceae
- Subfamily: Orchidoideae
- Tribe: Diurideae
- Subtribe: Cryptostylidinae
- Genus: Cryptostylis; R.Br.

Synonyms
- Chlorosa Blume; Zosterostylis Blume

= Cryptostylis =

Tongue orchids

Species of orchid

Cryptostylis, commonly known as tongue orchids, is a genus of flowering plants from the orchid family. Tongue orchids are terrestrial herbs with one to a few stalked leaves at the base of the flowering stem, or leafless. One to a few dull coloured flowers are borne on an erect flowering stem. The most conspicuous part of the flower is the labellum, compared to the much reduced sepals and petals. At least some species are pollinated by wasps when they attempt to mate with the flower. There are about twenty five species found in South Asia, Southeast Asia and the South Pacific.

== Description ==
Orchids in the genus Cryptostylis are terrestrial, perennial herbs with a thick, branching underground rhizome with vertical shoots forming at nodes. The plant has thick, fleshy roots but lacks a tuber. There are one to a few erect leaves, each with a distinct petiole and often purple on the lower surface, although C. hunteriana is saprophytic and leafless. New leaves are produced each year after flowering but each leaf has a life of several years.

The inflorescence is a raceme with from one to a few non-resupinate flowers. The sepals and petals (apart from the labellum) are narrow, free from and similar to each other. The most conspicuous part of the flower is the labellum which is attached to the base of the column and closely surrounds it. The fruit is a thin-walled capsule containing a large number of light coloured seeds.

== Taxonomy and naming ==
Cryptostylis was first formally described in 1810 by the prolific Scottish botanist, Robert Brown and the description was published in his book, Prodromus Florae Novae Hollandiae et Insulae Van Diemen. Brown described three species in the same publication (C. longifolia, C. ovata and C. erecta) but did not nominate a type species. (Cryptostylis longifolia is an illegitimate name and the species is now known as C. subulata.)

The name Cryptostylis is derived from the Ancient Greek words kryptos meaning "hidden" and stylos meaning "pillar" or "column", referring to the column of these orchids which is partly hidden by the labellum.

Molecular study of the DNA of tongue orchids shows the genus lies within the tribe Diurideae within the orchid family, having previously been considered part of the Cranichideae. The genera Cryptostylis and Coilochilus (endemic to New Caledonia) make up the subtribe Cryptostylidinae.

== Distribution and habitat ==
The genus comprises around twenty five species of terrestrial orchid distributed from India, Sri Lanka, Thailand, Taiwan, the Philippines, and Malaysia through Indonesia to Australia and New Zealand, as well as Samoa, New Caledonia and Vanuatu. Five species are found in Australia, of which three are endemic. Tongue orchids occur from temperate to tropical regions and in well-drained to swampy sites. Cryptostylis arachnites has the widest distribution and grows in rainforest, often in mountainous areas.

== Ecology ==
All Australian species are pollinated by the ichneumon wasp known as the orchid dupe wasp (Lissopimpla excelsa). The male wasp mistakes the flower parts for a female wasp and attempts to copulate with it. Although the different species can occur together, they appear to inhibit cross-fertilisation and no hybrids are found in nature. This discovery was made by Australian naturalist Edith Coleman in 1928, and the term coined was "pseudocopulation". The mimicking of flowers to resemble female wasp parts has since been recorded in other orchid genera but only in Cryptostylis has the insect been observed ejecting seminal fluid containing sperm cells. Coleman suggested that the males are more strongly attracted to the orchid flowers than to female wasps of the same species. The flowers of Cryptostylis orchids and female wasp body parts are very similar in colour when viewed under a hymenopteran visual system, despite looking different to human eyes. Although the colours that ichneumon wasps see are unknown, bees and wasps have similar perception with green, blue and ultraviolet wavelengths.

The Cryptostylis orchids are unusual in that several species are pollinated by the same wasp species; other orchids which mimic insects are often species-specific. The flowers have no smell detectable to humans, but have been shown to have an odour which attracts the orchid dupe wasp. Furthermore, gas chromatography and electrophysiology show that the single active compound for pollinator attraction is found in different species of Cryptostylis.

== Species ==
Species currently accepted as of July 2018:

- Cryptostylis acutata J.J.Sm. - Java, Borneo, Sumatra
- Cryptostylis apiculata J.J.Sm. - New Guinea
- Cryptostylis arachnites (Blume) Hassk. in C.L.Blume - Guangdong, Guangxi, Taiwan, Cambodia, Assam, Indonesia, Laos, Malaysia, Myanmar, New Guinea, Philippines, Sri Lanka, Thailand, Laos, Myanmar, Vietnam, Andaman Islands, Solomon Islands, Fiji, New Caledonia, Samoa, Vanuatu
- Cryptostylis arfakensis J.J.Sm. - New Guinea
- Cryptostylis carinata J.J.Sm. - New Guinea
- Cryptostylis clemensii (Ames & C.Schweinf.) J.J.Sm. - Sabah
- Cryptostylis concava Schltr. - New Guinea
- Cryptostylis conspicua J.J.Sm. - Thailand, Malaysia, Java, Sumatra
- Cryptostylis erecta R.Br. - Queensland, New South Wales, Victoria
- Cryptostylis filiformis Blume - Java
- Cryptostylis gracilis Schltr. - New Guinea
- Cryptostylis hamadryas Schltr. - New Guinea
- Cryptostylis hunteriana Nicholls - Queensland, New South Wales, Victoria
- Cryptostylis javanica J.J.Sm. - Java
- Cryptostylis lancilabris Schltr. - New Guinea
- Cryptostylis leptochila F.Muell. ex Benth. - Queensland, New South Wales, Victoria, Tasmania
- Cryptostylis ligulata J.J.Sm. - New Guinea
- Cryptostylis maculata (J.J.Sm.) J.J.Sm. - New Guinea
- Cryptostylis ovata R.Br. - Western Australia
- Cryptostylis sigmoidea J.J.Sm. - New Guinea
- Cryptostylis sororia Schltr. - New Guinea
- Cryptostylis subulata (Labill.) Rchb.f. - Queensland, New South Wales, Victoria, Tasmania, South Australia, New Zealand North Island
- Cryptostylis taiwaniana Masam. - Taiwan, Philippine

== See also ==
- List of Orchidaceae genera
