= Pterostylis littoralis =

Coastal leafy greenhood

Scientific classification
- Kingdom: Plantae
- Clade: Tracheophytes
- Clade: Angiosperms
- Clade: Monocots
- Order: Asparagales
- Family: Orchidaceae
- Subfamily: Orchidoideae
- Tribe: Cranichideae
- Genus: Pterostylis
- Species: P. littoralis

Binomial name
- Pterostylis littoralis (D.L.Jones) R.J.Bates

Synonyms
- Bunochilus littoralis D.L.Jones

Species of orchid

Pterostylis littoralis, commonly known as coastal leafy greenhood, is a plant in the orchid family Orchidaceae and is endemic to South Australia. Flowering plants have up to five pale green flowers with darker green stripes and brownish tips. The flowers have a narrow, pale green labellum. Non-flowering plants have a rosette of leaves on a short, thin stalk but flowering plants lack the rosette, instead having four or five stem leaves.

== Description ==
Pterostylis littoralis, is a terrestrial, perennial, deciduous, herb with an underground tuber. Non-flowering plants have a rosette of between three and five leaves. The leaves are 10–30 mm (0.4–1 in) long and 3–10 mm (0.1–0.4 in) wide on a thin stalk 30–70 mm (1–3 in) long. Flowering plants have up to five pale-whitish green flowers with darker green stripes on a flowering spike 100–250 mm (4–10 in) high. The flowers are 13–17 mm (0.5–0.7 in) long and 4–5 mm (0.16–0.20 in) wide. The flowering spike has four or five stem leaves which are 10–45 mm (0.4–2 in) long and 4–10 mm (0.2–0.4 in) wide. The dorsal sepal and petals are fused, forming a hood or "galea" over the column with the dorsal sepal having a short point on its brownish tip. The lateral sepals turn downwards and are 9–12 mm (0.4–0.5 in) long, 4–5 mm (0.16–0.20 in) wide, joined for part of their length and have brownish tips. The labellum is 5–6 mm (0.20–0.24 in) long, about 2 mm (0.08 in) wide and pale green with a darker green stripe along its centre. Flowering occurs from July to September.

== Taxonomy and naming ==
Coastal leafy greenhood was first formally described in 2006 by David Jones who gave it the name Bunochilus littoralis and published the description in Australian Orchid Research from a specimen collected near Lake St Clair. In 2008 Robert Bates changed the name to Pterostylis littoralis. The specific epithet (littoralis) is derived from the Latin word littus meaning "shore", referring to the coastal habitat preference of this species.

== Distribution and habitat ==
Pterostylis littoralis grows in dense coastal scrub in coastal areas near Robe.
