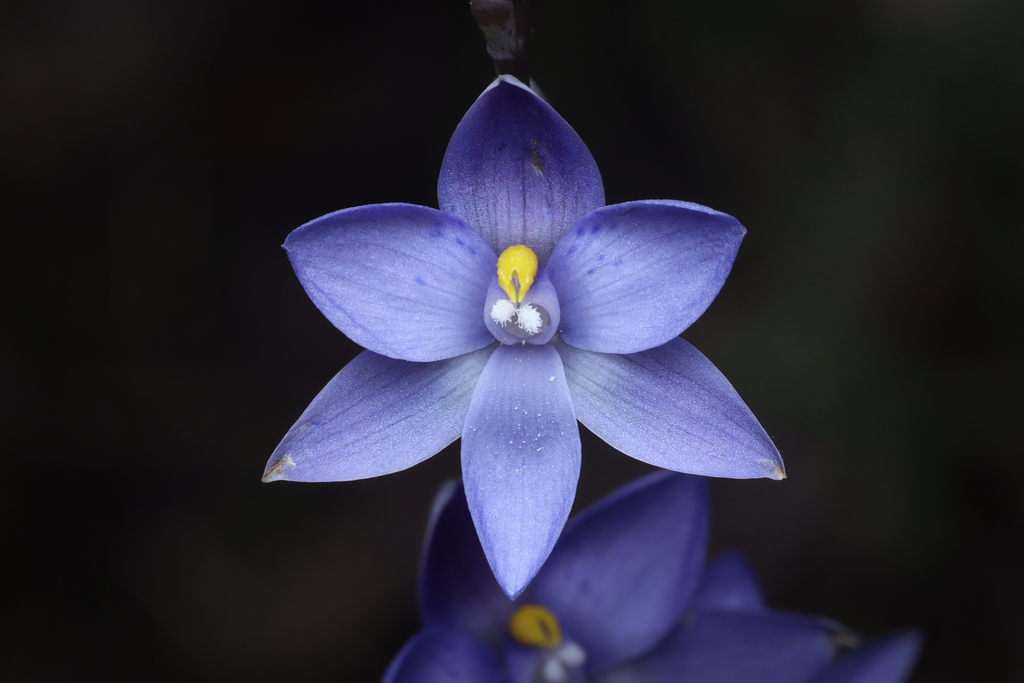

Scientific classification
- Kingdom: Plantae
- Clade: Tracheophytes
- Clade: Angiosperms
- Clade: Monocots
- Order: Asparagales
- Family: Orchidaceae
- Subfamily: Orchidoideae
- Tribe: Diurideae
- Genus: Thelymitra
- Species: T. × truncata

Binomial name
- Thelymitra × truncata R.S.Rogers

Synonyms
- Thelymitra ixioides var. truncata (R.S.Rogers) Nicholls

= Thelymitra × truncata =

Truncate sun orchid

Species of orchid

Thelymitra × truncata, commonly called truncate sun orchid, is a species of orchid that is endemic to south-eastern Australia. It has a single tapering, more or less flat leaf with a reddish base and up to six blue, pink or white flowers with a tube-shaped lobe on top of the anther. It is a natural hybrid between a range of species, including T. pauciflora and T. ixioides.

== Description ==
Thelymitra × truncata is a tuberous, perennial herb with a single more or less flat or channelled, tapering linear to lance-shaped leaf 80–300 mm (3–10 in) long and 2–8 mm (0.08–0.3 in) wide with a reddish base. Up to six or more pale to deep blue, pinkish or sometimes white flowers 20–25 mm (0.8–1 in) wide are arranged on a flowering stem 70–550 mm (3–20 in) tall. There are one or two bracts along the flowering stem. The sepals and petals are 6–18 mm (0.2–0.7 in) long. The column is a similar colour to the petals and 3–5 mm (0.1–0.2 in) long. The lobe on top of the anther is tube-shaped with a dark collar and a yellow tip. The side lobes have mop-like tufts of white hairs on their ends. Flowering occurs from October to December. The plants are variable, due to crossing between a range of species to produce this hybrid.

== Taxonomy and naming ==
Thelymitra × truncata was first formally described in 1917 by Richard Sanders Rogers from a specimen collected near Myponga and the description was published in Transactions and Proceedings of the Royal Society of South Australia. The specific epithet (x truncata) is a Latin word meaning "to maim or shorten by cutting off", referring to the shaped of the middle lobe on top of the column.

== Distribution and habitat ==
Truncate sun orchid is widespread but uncommon, growing in heath, woodland and open forest. It occurs in southern New South Wales, most of Victoria, south-eastern South Australia and in Tasmania.
