= Caladenia leptochila subsp. dentata =

Toothed spider orchid

Scientific classification
- Kingdom: Plantae
- Clade: Tracheophytes
- Clade: Angiosperms
- Clade: Monocots
- Order: Asparagales
- Family: Orchidaceae
- Subfamily: Orchidoideae
- Tribe: Diurideae
- Genus: Caladenia
- Species: C. leptochila
- Subspecies: C. l. subsp. dentata

Trinomial name
- Caladenia leptochila subsp. dentata (D.L.Jones) R.J.Bates

Synonyms
- Arachnorchis leptochila subsp. dentata D.L.Jones

Subspecies of orchid

Caladenia leptochila subsp. dentata, commonly known as the toothed spider orchid, narrow-lipped spider-orchid or narrow-lipped caladenia, is a plant in the orchid family Orchidaceae and is endemic to South Australia. It has a single leaf and one or two mostly reddish-brown flowers. It differs from subspecies leptochila in the colour of its flowers, toothed edges to its labellum, and its distribution.

== Description ==
Caladenia leptochila subsp. dentata is a terrestrial, perennial, deciduous, herb with an underground tuber and which usually occurs as single plants or in small groups. It has a single, densely hairy, narrow-lanceolate leaf, 40–140 mm (2–6 in) long. One or two reddish-brown and yellowish-green flowers are borne on a spike 150–450 mm (6–20 in) tall. The sepals have thin, club-like glandular tips 5–8 mm (0.2–0.3 in) long. The dorsal sepal curves forward and is 25–30 mm (0.98–1.2 in) long. The lateral sepals are a similar size to the dorsal sepal and turn stiffly upwards. The petals are 20–25 mm (0.8–1 in) long, sickle-shaped, taper to a thin point and turn upwards. The labellum is oblong to broad lance-shaped, 11–13 mm (0.4–0.5 in) long, about 4.5 mm (0.2 in) wide and dark reddish-brown with the tip rolled under. There are many short teeth along the sides of the labellum and four rows of calli along its centre on the flatter part. Flowering occurs from October to November.

== Taxonomy and naming ==
The toothed spider orchid was first formally described by David Jones in 2006 and given the name Arachnorchis leptochila subsp. dentata. The description was published in Australian Orchid Research from a specimen collected in Alligator Gorge. In 2008 Robert Bates changed the name to Caladenia leptochila subsp. dentata and the change was published in the Journal of the Adelaide Botanic Garden. The epithet (dentata) is a Latin word meaning “toothed” or "pointed" referring to the teeth on the edges of the labellum.

== Distribution and habitat ==
The toothed spider orchid occurs in the Flinders Ranges where it grows below shrubs on forest slopes at altitudes of 700–800 m (2,000–3,000 ft).
