= Diuris inundata =

Scientific classification
- Kingdom: Plantae
- Clade: Tracheophytes
- Clade: Angiosperms
- Clade: Monocots
- Order: Asparagales
- Family: Orchidaceae
- Subfamily: Orchidoideae
- Tribe: Diurideae
- Genus: Diuris
- Species: D. inundata

Binomial name
- Diuris inundata D.L.Jones & R.J.Bates

Species of orchid

Diuris inundata is a species of orchid that is endemic to south-eastern continental Australia. It usually has between three and six grass-like leaves and a flowering stem with one or two pale yellow to buttercup yellow flowers with a few rusty-red specks.

== Description ==
Diuris inundata is a tuberous, terrestrial herb usually with a loose tuft of pale green, linear leaves 60–100 mm (2.4–3.9 in) long and 2–6 mm (0.079–0.236 in) wide. One or two pale yellow to buttercup yellow flowers 15–25 mm (0.59–0.98 in) wide are borne on a flowering stem 100–350 mm (3.9–13.8 in) tall. The dorsal sepal is egg-shaped, 10–12 mm (0.39–0.47 in) long, 5–8 mm (0.20–0.31 in) wide, the lateral sepals linear, paper-thin, 15–20 mm (0.59–0.79 in) long, 2–4 mm (0.079–0.157 in) wide and diverge from each other. The petals spread horizontally apart and are narrowly egg-shaped to narrowly elliptic, 10–15 mm (0.39–0.59 in) long and 4–7 mm (0.16–0.28 in) wide. The labellum has three lobes, the middle lobe triangular, 10–20 mm (0.39–0.79 in) long and about 15 mm (0.59 in) wide and the side lobes triangular, about 2 mm (0.079 in) long and 1.5 mm (0.059 in) wide and fringed with red. There are two diverging, densely pimply calli ridges. Flowering occurs as the habitat dries after winter, from early September to late November.

== Taxonomy and naming ==
Diuris inundata was first formally described in 2017 by David Jones and Robert Bates in Australian Orchid Review from specimens collected near Penola in 2005. The specific epithet (inundata) means "inundated", referring to the winter-wet places preferred by this species.

== Distribution and habitat ==
This species of orchid usually grows among sedges and shrubs in winter-wet river red gum forest, in south-eastern South Australia and nearby areas of Victoria.
