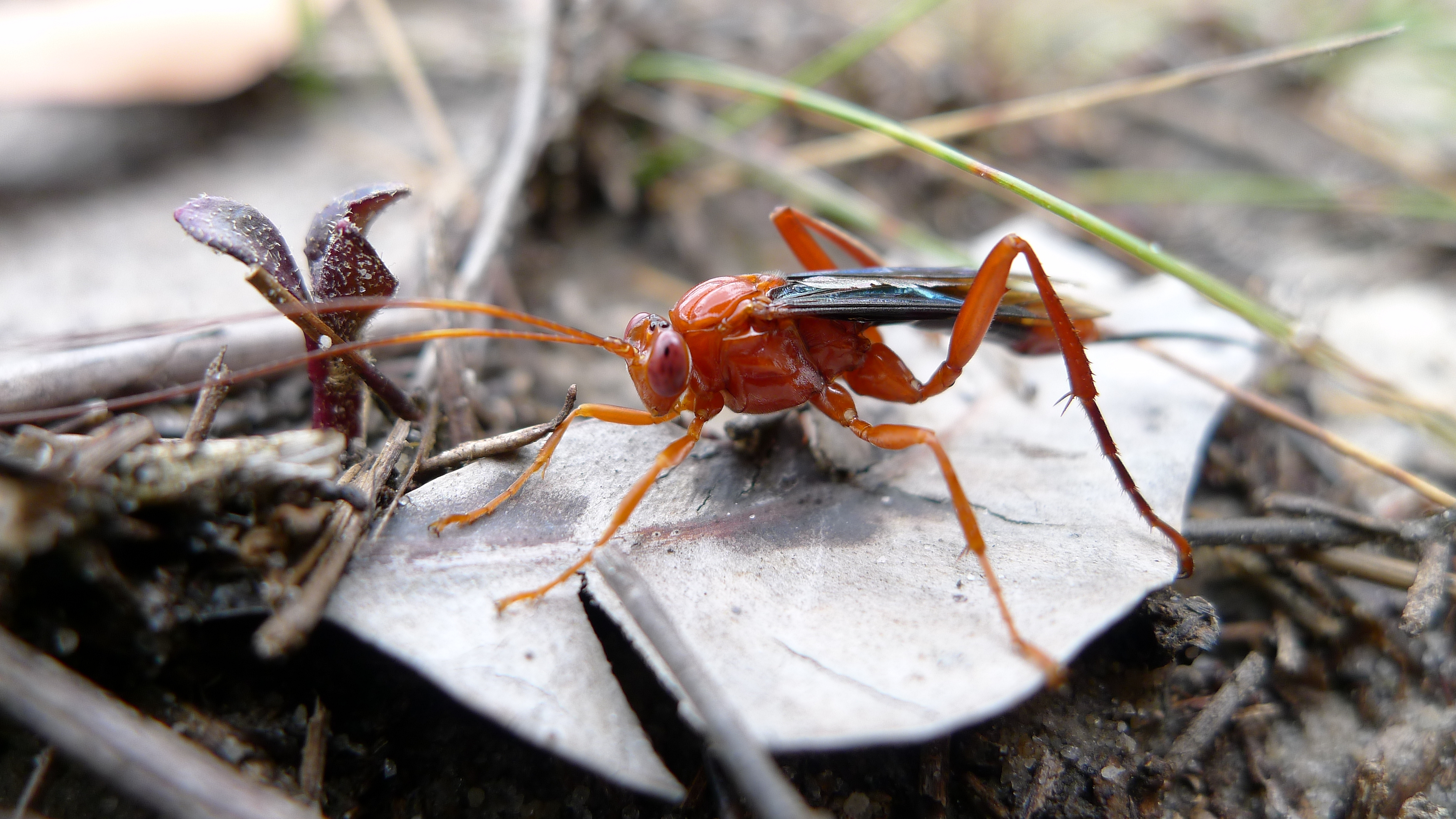
- Lissopimpla excelsa

Scientific classification
- Domain: Eukaryota
- Kingdom: Animalia
- Phylum: Arthropoda
- Class: Insecta
- Order: Hymenoptera
- Family: Ichneumonidae
- Genus: Lissopimpla; Kriechbaumer, 1889

Species
- See text

= Lissopimpla =

Genus of insects

Lissopimpla is a genus of parasitoid wasps belonging to the family Ichneumonidae. The species of this genus are found in Australia.

== Species ==
The Lissopimpla includes the following species:

- Lissopimpla albopicta (Walker, 1860)
- Lissopimpla atra Girault, 1924
- Lissopimpla excelsa (Costa, 1864)
