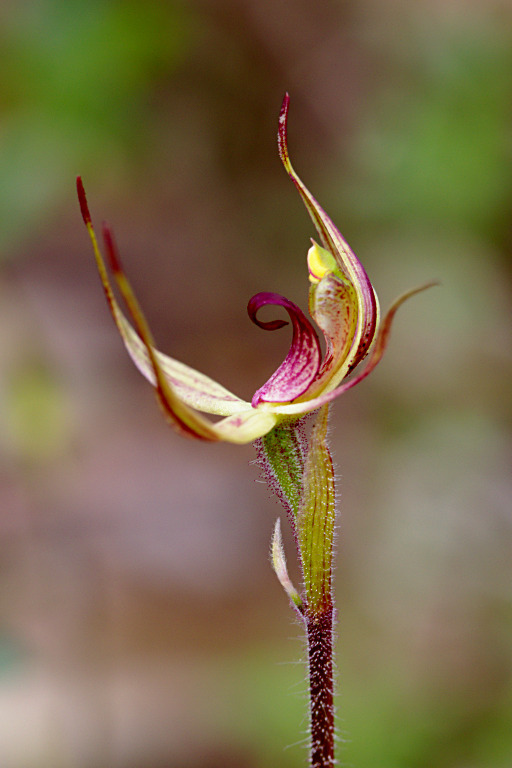

Scientific classification
- Kingdom: Plantae
- Clade: Tracheophytes
- Clade: Angiosperms
- Clade: Monocots
- Order: Asparagales
- Family: Orchidaceae
- Subfamily: Orchidoideae
- Tribe: Diurideae
- Genus: Caladenia
- Species: C. leptochila

Binomial name
- Caladenia leptochila Fitzg.

Synonyms
- Arachnorchis leptochila (Fitzg.) D.L.Jones & M.A.Clem.; Phlebochilus leptochila (Fitzg.) Szlach.; Phlebochilus leptochilus Hopper & A.P.Br. orth. var.

= Caladenia leptochila =

Species of orchid

Caladenia leptochila, commonly known s narrow-lipped spider-orchid or narrow-lipped caladenia, is a species of flowering plant in the orchid family Orchidaceae and is endemic to South Australia. It is a ground orchid with a single slender, hairy leaf and one or two yellowish-green and reddish-brown flowers.

== Description ==
Caladenia leptochila is a terrestrial, perennial, deciduous herb with a single, densely hairy, narrowly lance-shaped leaf 40–140 mm (1.6–5.5 in) long. The plant is 150–450 mm (5.9–17.7 in) high with one or two yellowish-green and reddish-brown flowers with a dark red labellum. The dordal sepal is 25–30 mm (0.98–1.18 in) long and curved under, tapering to a fine, club-shaped point. The lateral sepals and petals are 35–65 mm (1.4–2.6 in) long with a central reddish-brown stripe.

== Taxonomy and naming ==
Caladenia leptochila was first formally described in 1882 by Robert D. FitzGerald in The Gardeners' Chronicle from specimens collected on Mount Lofty.

In 2008, Robyn Mary Barker and Robert John Bates transferred Arachnorchis leptochila subsp. dentata D.L.Jones to the genus Caladenia as Caladenia leptochila subsp. dentata in the Journal of the Adelaide Botanic Gardens, and the name, and that of the autonym are accepted by the Australian Plant Census:

- Caladenia leptochila subsp. dentata (D.L.Jones) R.J.Bates
- Caladenia leptochila Fitzg. subsp. leptochila

== Distribution and habitat ==
Subspecies dentata is found in the Flinders Ranges where it grows below shrubs on forest slopes at altitudes of 700–800 m (2,300–2,600 ft), and subsp. leptochila grows in clay or gravelly soils in shrubby forest in the Mount Lofty Ranges. The latter subspecies is thought to have been common in Victoria in the past but is now probably extinct in that state.
