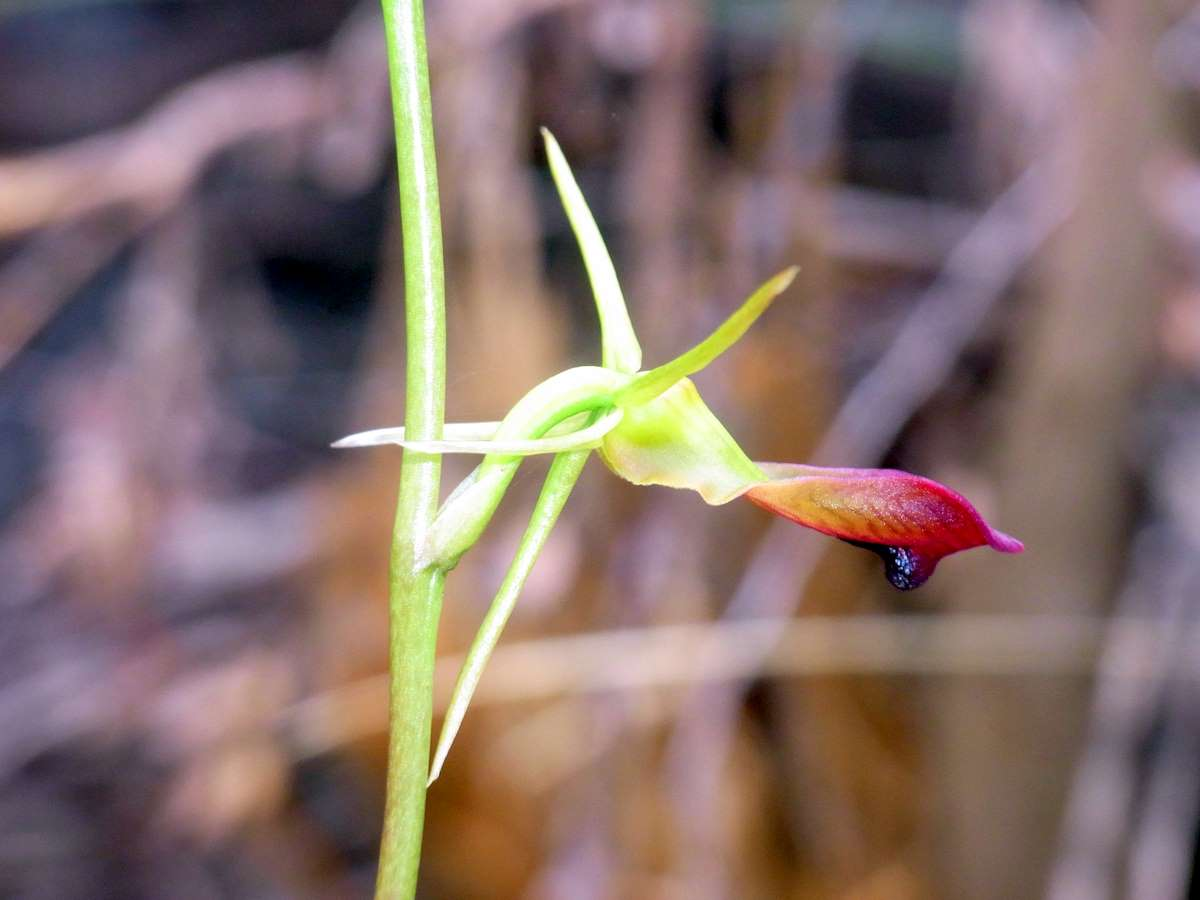
- In Ku-ring-gai Chase National Park

Scientific classification
- Kingdom: Plantae
- Clade: Tracheophytes
- Clade: Angiosperms
- Clade: Monocots
- Order: Asparagales
- Family: Orchidaceae
- Subfamily: Orchidoideae
- Tribe: Diurideae
- Genus: Cryptostylis
- Species: C. subulata

Binomial name
- Cryptostylis subulata (Labill.) Rchb.f.

Synonyms
- Cryptostylis longifolia R.Br. nom. illeg., nom. superfl.; Malaxia subulata R.S.Rogers orth. var.; Malaxis subulata Labill.

= Cryptostylis subulata =

Large tongue orchid

Species of orchid

Cryptostylis subulata, commonly known as large tongue orchid, duckbill orchid or cow orchid, is a common and widespread orchid in south eastern Australia and New Zealand. It has relatively large, leathery, dark green to yellowish-green leaves and up to twenty yellowish flowers with a reddish-brown and dark purple labellum. It is often found in damp or swampy situations but also occurs in drier places.

== Description ==
Cryptostylis subulata is a terrestrial, perennial, deciduous, herb with leathery, dark green to yellowish-green leaves which sit on petioles that are anywhere from 1 to 15 cm (0.5 to 6 in) long. The leaves are lance-shaped and measure 5–20 cm (2–8 in) long and 1–3 cm (0.5–1 in) across. The inflorescences (flower spikes) appear from August to April and bear two to twenty individual flowers on a flowering stem which is 50–80 cm (19.5–31.5 in) tall. Each flower has three green sepals which are 1.8 to 3 cm (0.71 to 1.18 in) long, and two petals which are 1.0 to 1.3 cm (0.39 to 0.51 in) long and narrower than the sepals. The labellum is a rolled reddish brown, purplish or yellowish tube-like structure measuring 1.5–3.5 cm (0.59–1.38 in) long by 0.5–1 cm (0.20–0.39 in) across. There is a dark purple callus ending in two knobs on the lower side of the labellum.

== Taxonomy and naming ==
Large tongue orchid was first formally described in 1806 by Jacques Labillardière from a specimen collected in Tasmania. Labillardière gave it the name Malaxis subulata and published the description in Novae Hollandiae Plantarum Specimen. In 1871 H.G. Reichenbach changed the name to Cryptostylis subulata. The specific epithet (subulata) is derived from the Latin word subula meaning "awl".

== Distribution and habitat ==
It is tolerant of a range of soils, from well-drained sandy heathland to swampy depressed areas, as well as dry eucalypt forest. It occurs mostly in coastal districts of Queensland, New South Wales, Victoria and Tasmania, although it is also found in the Blue Mountains. In New Zealand it is only known from swamps north of Kaitaia and Taipa-Mangonui.

== Ecology ==
Like other Australian members of its genus, it is pollinated by the ichneumon wasp known as the orchid dupe wasp (Lissopimpla excelsa), the males of which mistake the flower parts for female wasps and copulate with it.

== Use in horticulture ==
Cryptostylis subulata has been successfully grown by orchid enthusiasts, but is slow growing. The rhizomes are delicate and resent disturbance, and need to be moist at all times.
