= Coilochilus =

Conservation status
- Least Concern (IUCN 3.1)
- CITES Appendix II (CITES)

Scientific classification
- Kingdom: Plantae
- Clade: Tracheophytes
- Clade: Angiosperms
- Clade: Monocots
- Order: Asparagales
- Family: Orchidaceae
- Subfamily: Orchidoideae
- Tribe: Diurideae
- Subtribe: Cryptostylidinae
- Genus: Coilochilus; Schltr.
- Species: C. neocaledonicum

Binomial name
- Coilochilus neocaledonicum Schltr.

Genus of orchids

Coilochilus is a genus of terrestrial orchids containing only one species, Coilochilus neocaledonicum, endemic to New Caledonia. This monotypic genus was described by German botanist Rudolf Schlechter in 1906 and is now placed in the subtribe Cryptostylidinae.

== Distribution and habitat ==
Coilochilus neocaledonicum is widespread on the island of Grande Terre in New Caledonia. It occurs in humid forests dominated by species of Agathis and Araucaria and in moist shrubland gullies at elevations of 50–1,400 m (160–4,590 ft) above sea level.

== Description ==
Coilochilus neocaledonicum is a perennial terrestrial herb. It lacks tubers, but has thick, fleshy roots. Only one strap-like leaf arises per shoot. The inflorescence is an erect raceme that bears many tiny, dull-coloured flowers. The fruits are dehiscent capsules.

== Conservation status ==
Coilochilus neocaledonicum is listed as least concern on the International Union for the Conservation of Nature Red List, though some populations may be impacted by mining.
