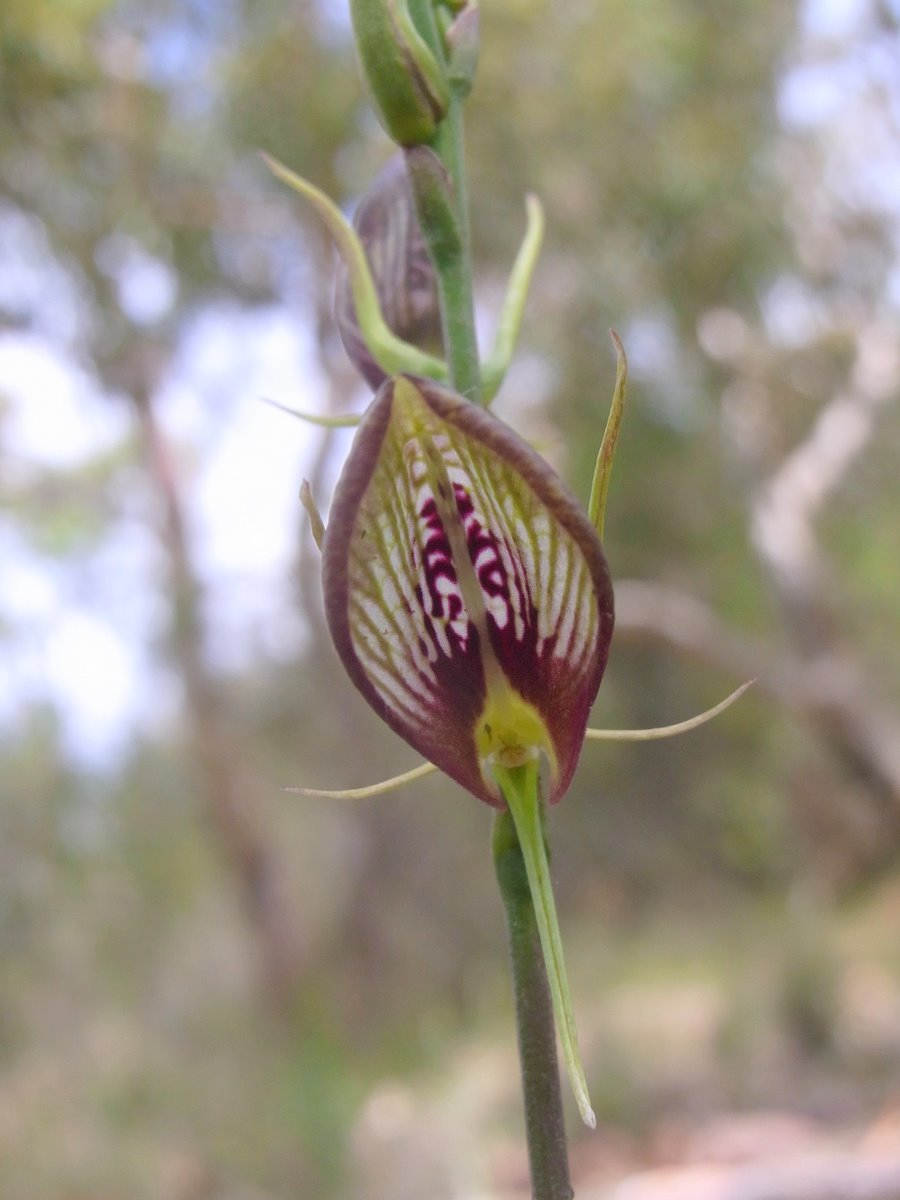
- Ku-ring-gai Chase National Park, Australia

Scientific classification
- Kingdom: Plantae
- Clade: Tracheophytes
- Clade: Angiosperms
- Clade: Monocots
- Order: Asparagales
- Family: Orchidaceae
- Subfamily: Orchidoideae
- Tribe: Diurideae
- Genus: Cryptostylis
- Species: C. erecta

Binomial name
- Cryptostylis erecta R.Br.

= Cryptostylis erecta =

Bonnet orchid

Species of orchid

Cryptostylis erecta, commonly known as the bonnet orchid or tartan tongue orchid , is an orchid endemic to south eastern Australia. A small and common plant, it has dark green lance-shaped to egg-shaped leaves and up to twelve greenish flowers with a large, bonnet-like or hood-like, lilac-coloured labellum with a network of purple veins.

== Description ==
Cryptostylis erecta is a terrestrial, perennial, deciduous, herb with one to several egg-shaped to lance-shaped leaves 60–130 mm (2–5 in) long and 13–30 mm (0.5–1 in) wide on a petiole 10–100 mm (0.4–4 in) long. The leaves are dark green on the upper surface and purple below. Between two and twelve flowers 25–30 mm (0.98–1.2 in) long and 10–15 mm (0.4–0.6 in) wide are borne on a flower spike 300–800 mm (10–30 in) high. The most prominent feature of the flower is its hood- or bonnet-shaped labellum which is 20–30 mm (0.8–1 in) long and 10–15 mm (0.4–0.6 in) wide, greenish to lilac-coloured with a network of purple or maroon veins and a few purple spots. The base of the labellum is narrow and surrounds the column. The sepals are green, 18–25 mm (0.7–1 in) and 1.5–2 mm (0.06–0.08 in) and the petals are 10–15 mm (0.4–0.6 in) and about 1 mm (0.04 in) wide, all spreading apart from each other. Flowering occurs from September to April.

== Taxonomy and naming ==
Cryptostylis erecta was first formally described in 1810 by Robert Brown and the description was published in Prodromus Florae Novae Hollandiae et Insulae Van Diemen. The specific epithet (erecta) is a Latin word meaning "upright".

== Distribution and habitat ==
The natural habitat of C. erecta is on sandy soils, dry eucalyptus woodlands and heathlands. Its range extends from the Kroombit Tops National Park in Queensland south through New South Wales to east Gippsland in Victoria. It occurs mostly in coastal districts, although it is also found in the Upper Blue Mountains.

== Ecology ==
Like other Australian members of its genus, it is pollinated by the ichneumon wasp known as the orchid dupe wasp (Lissopimpla excelsa), the males of which mistake the flower parts for female wasps and copulate with it.

== Use in horticulture ==
Cryptostylis erecta has been successfully grown by orchid enthusiasts, but is slow growing. The rhizomes are delicate and resent disturbance, and need to be moist at all times.
