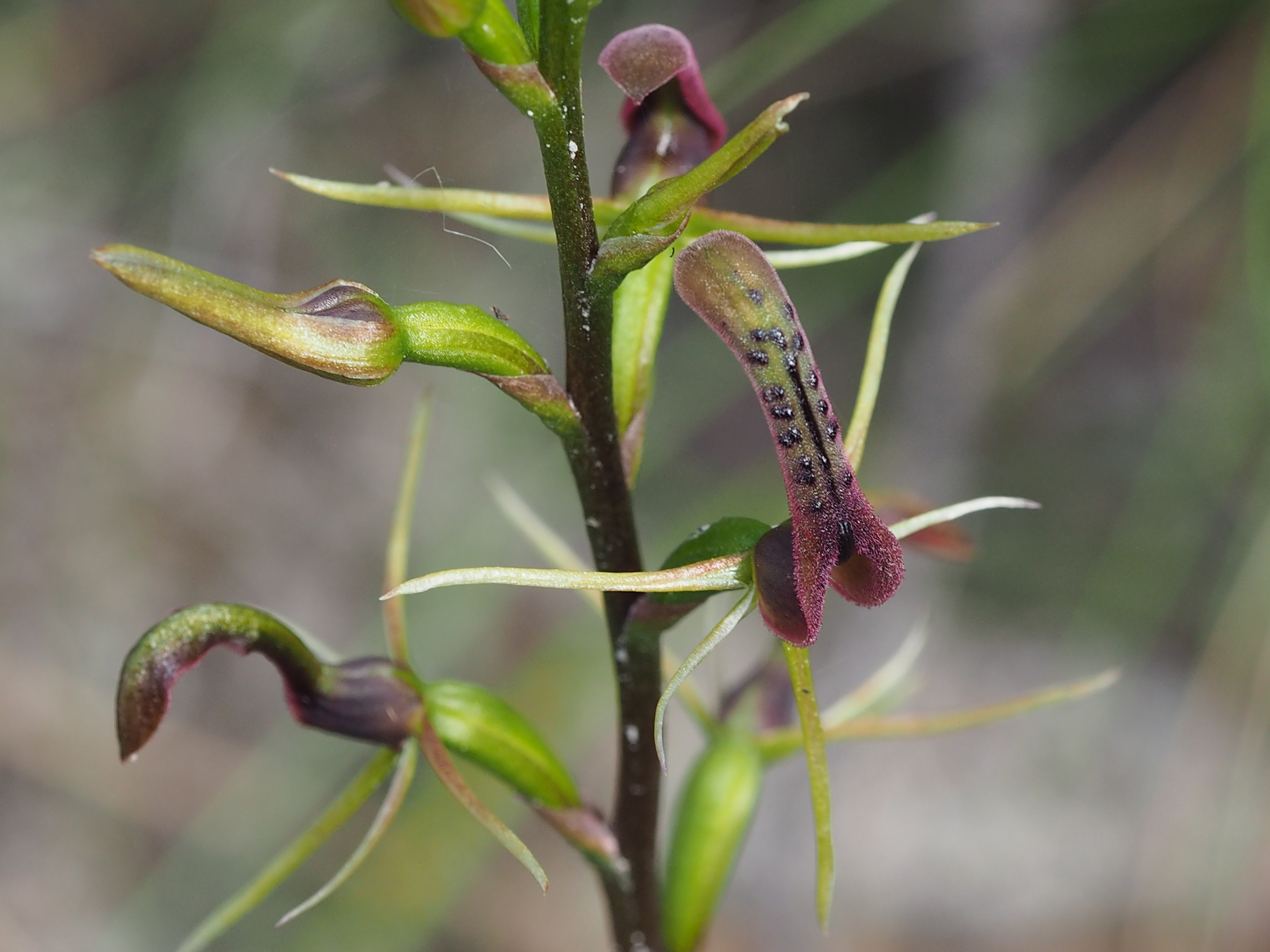
- In Cathedral Rock National Park

Scientific classification
- Kingdom: Plantae
- Clade: Embryophytes
- Clade: Tracheophytes
- Clade: Angiosperms
- Clade: Monocots
- Order: Asparagales
- Family: Orchidaceae
- Subfamily: Orchidoideae
- Tribe: Diurideae
- Genus: Cryptostylis
- Species: C. leptochila

Binomial name
- Cryptostylis leptochila F.Muell. ex Benth.

Synonyms
- Cryptostylis leptochila var. frenchiana F.Muell.; Cryptostylis leptochila F.Muell. ex Benth. var. leptochila

= Cryptostylis leptochila =

Small tongue orchid

Species of orchid

Cryptostylis leptochila, commonly known as small tongue orchid, is a species of orchid that is endemic to eastern Australia. It has one to a few broad leaves and up to fifteen green flowers with a dark red labellum that has a black stripe and rows of black dots either side of the stripe. As with others in the genus, it is pollinated by male ichneumon wasps.

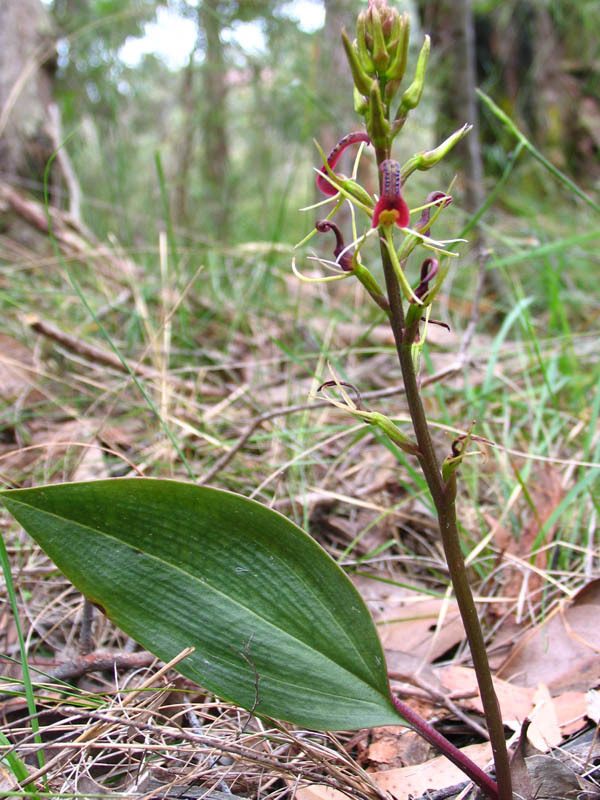
Cryptostylis leptochila habit

== Description ==
Cryptostylis leptochila is a terrestrial, perennial, deciduous, herb with one to several broad egg-shaped to broad lance-shaped leaves 18–120 mm (0.7–5 in) long and 25–40 mm (1–2 in) wide on a petiole 10–60 mm (0.4–2 in) long. The upper surface of the leaves is green but the lower side is reddish purple. Between five and fifteen flowers 15–20 mm (0.6–0.8 in) long and 4–5 mm (0.16–0.20 in) wide are borne on a flowering stem 200–400 mm (8–20 in) tall. The sepals and petals are linear, greenish or yellowish and spread stiffly apart. The sepals are 13–23 mm (0.5–0.9 in) long and the petals are 6–15 mm (0.2–0.6 in) long. The labellum is dark red, linear to oblong, cup-shaped around the column with its edges rolled under and the end suddenly turned downwards. It is 16–20 mm (0.6–0.8 in) long and about 5 mm (0.2 in) with a raised black central line and irregular lines of raised black calli either side of the line. The surface of the labellum is densely covered with glandular hairs. Flowering occurs from November to May and the flowers are pollinated by male Lissopimpla excelsa wasps when they attempt to mate with them.

== Taxonomy and naming ==
Cryptostylis leptochila was first formally described in 1873 by George Bentham from an unpublished description by Ferdinand von Mueller. The description was published in Flora Australiensis. The specific epithet (leptochila) is derived from the Ancient Greek words leptos meaning "fine", "small", "thin" or "delicate", and cheilos meaning "lip".

== Distribution and habitat ==
The small tongue orchid grows in forest, usually in high rainfall areas. It is found in south-eastern Queensland, on the coast and ranges of New South Wales, in southeastern Victoria and on Flinders Island.

== Conservation ==
This species is classed as "endangered" in Tasmania, where it occurs in a few locations on Flinders Island but is not in any nature reserve. The main threats to the species are inappropriate fire regimes and land clearing. It is listed under the Tasmanian Threatened Species Protection Act 1995.
