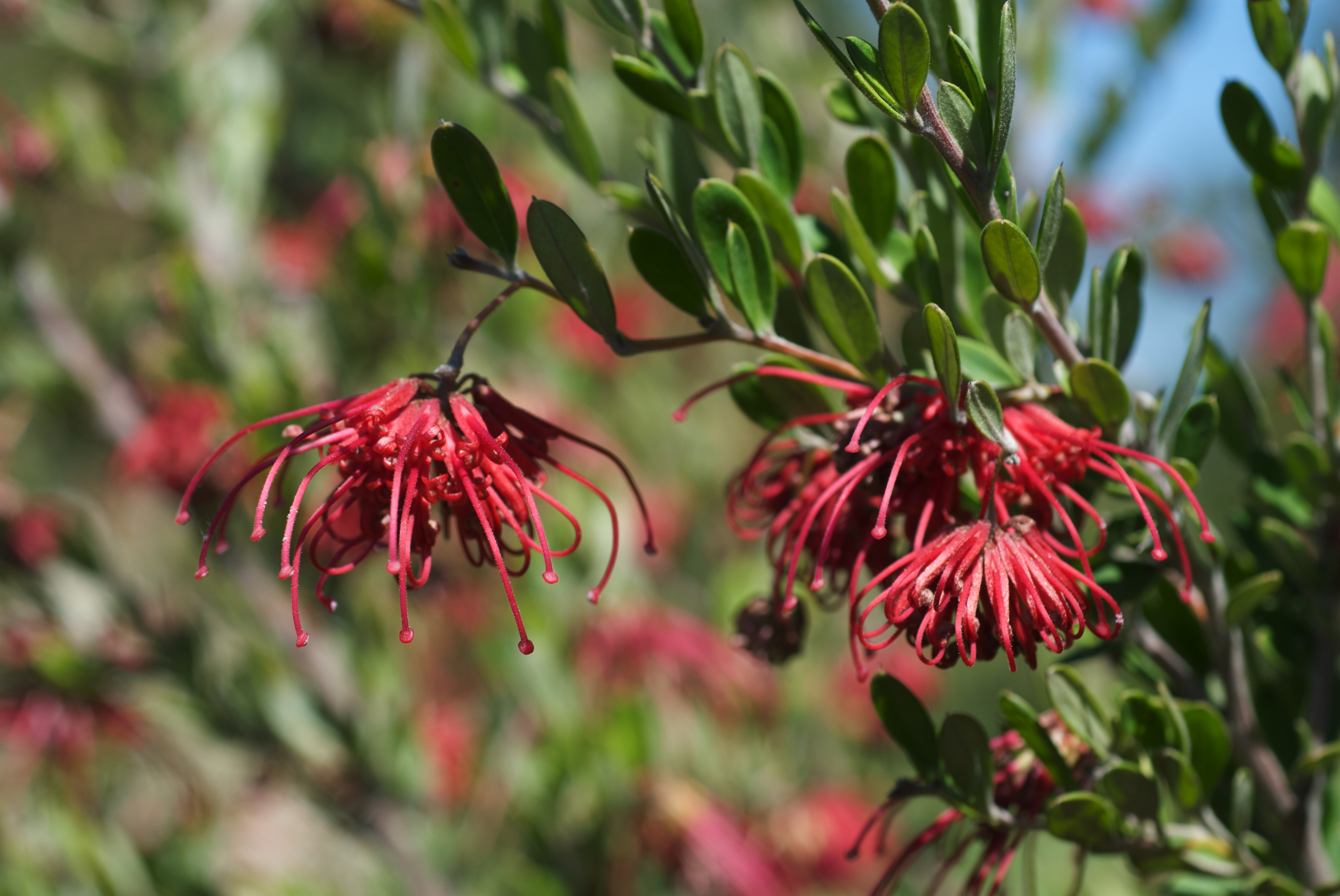

Conservation status
- Near Threatened (IUCN 3.1)

Scientific classification
- Kingdom: Plantae
- Clade: Tracheophytes
- Clade: Angiosperms
- Clade: Eudicots
- Order: Proteales
- Family: Proteaceae
- Genus: Grevillea
- Species: G. speciosa

Binomial name
- Grevillea speciosa (Knight) McGill.

= Grevillea speciosa =

Species of shrub endemic to Australia

Grevillea speciosa, commonly known as red spider flower, is a species of flowering plant in the family Proteaceae and is endemic to the Central Coast of New South Wales. It is an erect shrub with elliptic to egg-shaped or more or less circular leaves and more or less spherical, downturned clusters of red flowers.

== Description ==
Grevillea speciosa is an erect shrub that typically grows to a height of 0.4–3 m (1 ft 4 in – 9 ft 10 in), its branchlets covered with silky to shaggy hairs. The leaves are elliptic to egg-shaped with the narrower end towards the base, or more or less circular, mostly 10–40 mm (0.39–1.57 in) long and 4–12 mm (0.16–0.47 in) wide with the edges turned down. The lower surface of the leaves is silky to softly-hairy. The flowers are arranged in large, downturned, dome-shaped to spherical clusters 20–40 mm (0.79–1.57 in) long, the flowers red, rarely pink or very rarely cream-coloured. The pistil is 25–35 mm (0.98–1.38 in) long and the style is gently curved. Flowering mainly occurs from July to October, and the fruit is an elliptic to narrowly oval follicle 12–20 mm (0.47–0.79 in) long.

It is distinguishable from the similar Grevillea oleoides, mainly by its shorter, more ovate leaves.

== Taxonomy ==
This species was first formally described in 1809 by Joseph Knight who gave it the name Lysanthe speciosa in On the cultivation of the plants belonging to the natural order of Proteeae. In 1975, Donald McGillivray moved it to the genus Grevillea as Grevillea speciosa in the journal Telopea.

The specific epithet (speciosa) derives from Latin speciosus meaning "showy".

== Distribution and habitat ==
Red spider flower grows on ridgetops and hillsides in moist heath, low woodland and forest in sandy soil from Gosford, Kulnura and Bucketty to just south of Port Jackson on the central coast of New South Wales.

== Conservation status ==
Grevillea speciosa is listed as near threatened on the IUCN Red List of Threatened Species. It has an estimated population of 30,000-50,000 mature individuals and is likely declining due to increased urbanisation leading to habitat loss, as well as competition with invasive weeds and an increase in fire frequency and intensity.

== Use in horticulture ==
This species is available in many nurseries and is cultivated for its brightly-coloured, usually red flowers. Pink-flowered forms exist, and may be a result of hybridisation with other grevilleas.

It tolerates a wide variety of climates and can be grown in coastal or inland environments. It does best in a full-sun or part-shade position in either acidic or neutral sandy loam or clay soil that is well-drained but not too dry.
