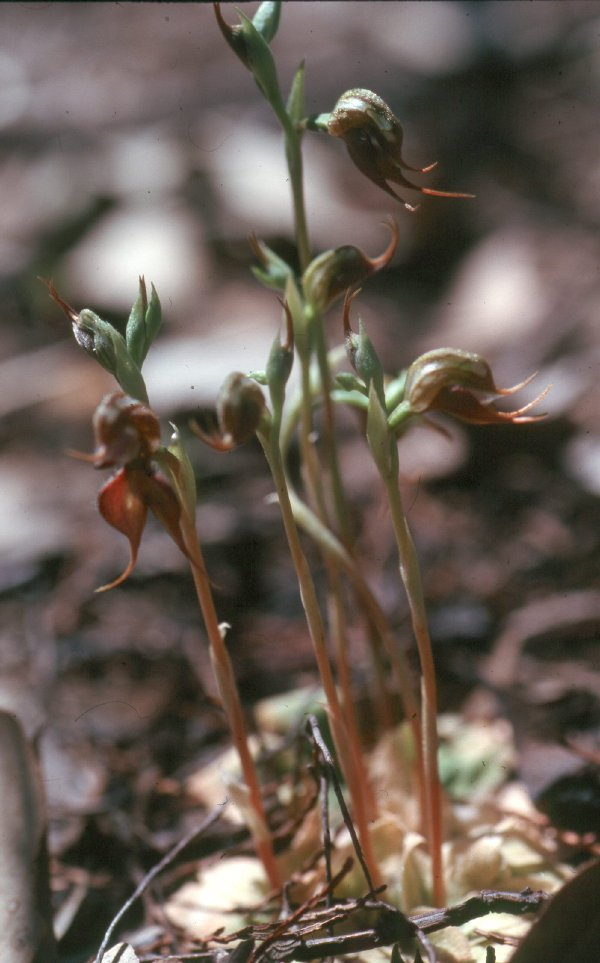

Scientific classification
- Kingdom: Plantae
- Clade: Tracheophytes
- Clade: Angiosperms
- Clade: Monocots
- Order: Asparagales
- Family: Orchidaceae
- Subfamily: Orchidoideae
- Tribe: Cranichideae
- Genus: Pterostylis
- Species: P. cobarensis

Binomial name
- Pterostylis cobarensis M.A.Clem.

Synonyms
- Oligochaetochilus cobarensis (M.A.Clem.) Szlach.

= Pterostylis cobarensis =

Inland rustyhood

Species of orchid

Pterostylis cobarensis, commonly known as the inland rustyhood or Cobar rustyhood is a plant in the orchid family Orchidaceae and is endemic to Australia. It has a rosette of leaves and between two and ten hairy, green and brown flowers with translucent white "windows" and a fleshy, insect-like labellum. It grows in inland areas of eastern Australia.

== Description ==
Pterostylis cobarensis, is a terrestrial, perennial, deciduous, herb with an underground tuber. It has a rosette of between six and fifteen narrow elliptic leaves at the base of the flowering spike, each leaf 15–35 mm (0.6–1 in) long and 5–10 mm (0.2–0.4 in) wide. Up to fifteen green and brown flowers with translucent white "windows", each flower 20–25 mm (0.8–1 in) long and 6–7 mm (0.2–0.3 in) wide, are borne on a flowering spike 200–400 mm (8–20 in) tall. Three to five stem leaves are wrapped around the flowering spike. The dorsal sepal and petals form a hood or "galea" over the column with the dorsal sepal having an upturned, thread-like point 12–13 mm (0.5–0.5 in) long. The lateral sepals turn downwards, shallowly dished with hairy edges and suddenly narrow to thin tips 7–10 mm (0.3–0.4 in) long spreading apart from each other. The labellum is thick, brownish or green, fleshy, insect-like, about 5 mm (0.2 in) long and 2 mm (0.08 in) wideand covered with short and long bristles. Flowering occurs from September to October.

== Taxonomy and naming ==
Pterostylis cobarensis was first formally described in 1989 by Mark Clements from a specimen collected near Cobar and the description was published in Australian Orchid Research. The specific epithet (cobarensis) alludes to the location of the type specimen.

== Distribution and habitat ==
The inland rustyhood occurs mainly in New South Wales between Broken Hill, Nyngan and Young, growing in rocky places and in mallee, usually where runoff occurs. It also occurs in border regions in South Australia and on the Darling Downs in Queensland.

== Conservation ==
Pterostylis cobarensis is classified as vulnerable in New South Wales.
