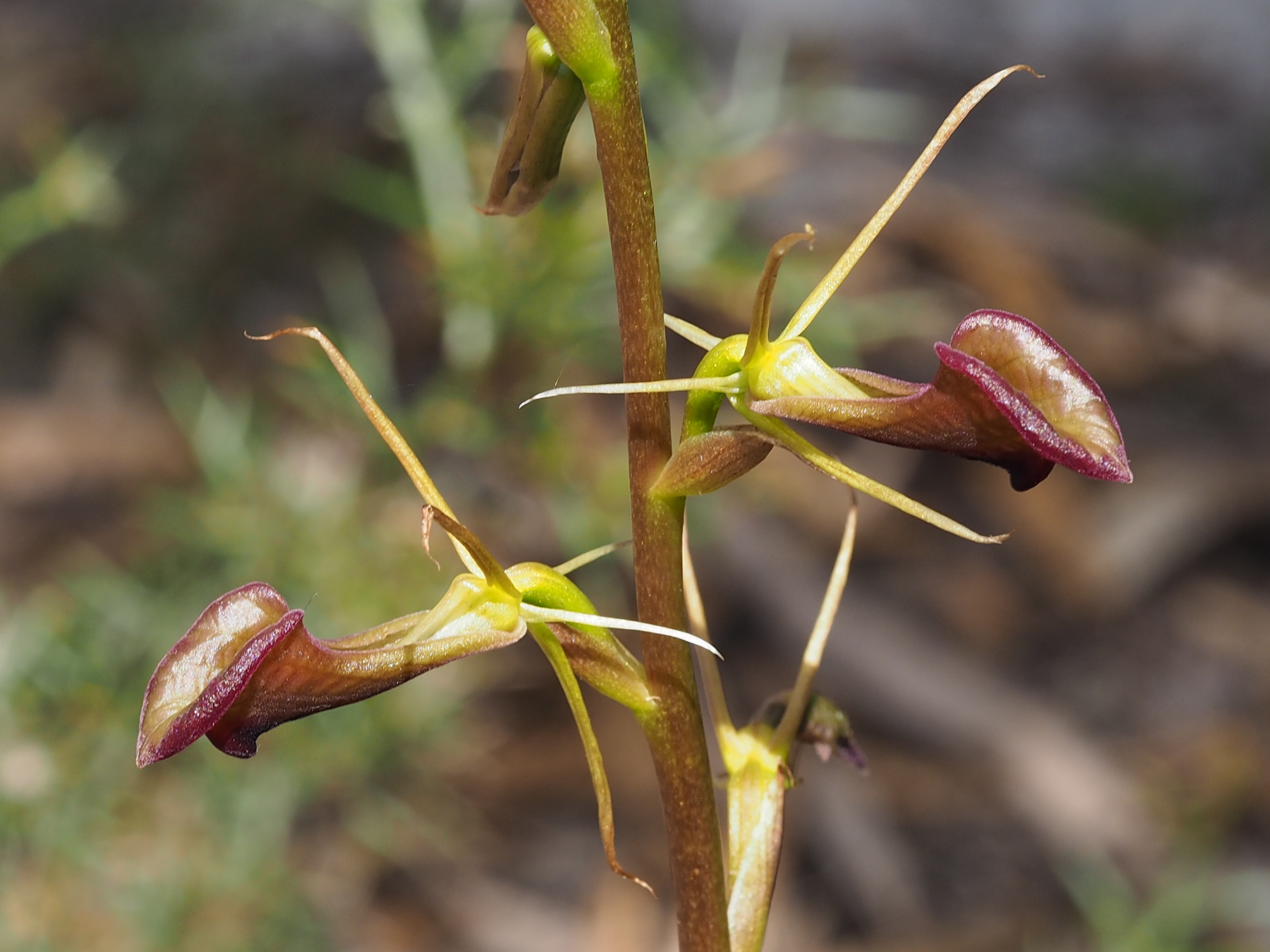
- At Emu Point near Albany

Scientific classification
- Kingdom: Plantae
- Clade: Tracheophytes
- Clade: Angiosperms
- Clade: Monocots
- Order: Asparagales
- Family: Orchidaceae
- Subfamily: Orchidoideae
- Tribe: Diurideae
- Genus: Cryptostylis
- Species: C. ovata

Binomial name
- Cryptostylis ovata R.Br.

= Cryptostylis ovata =

Slipper orchid

Species of orchid endemic to Western Australia

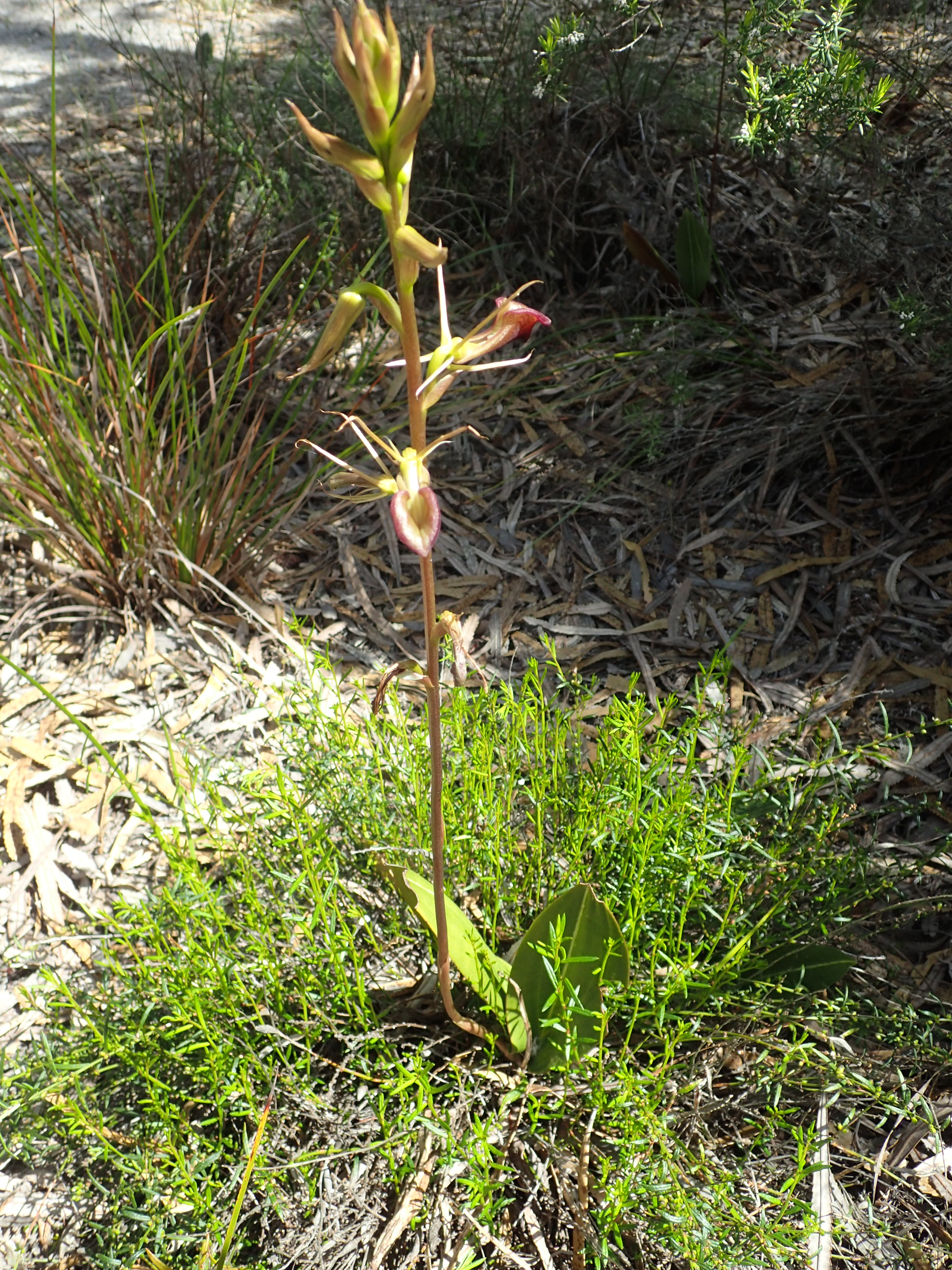
Whole plant

Cryptostylis ovata, commonly known as slipper orchid or western tongue orchid, is an orchid endemic to Western Australia. It is a common, summer flowering species with dark green leaves with a white central vein and up to fifteen pale greenish flowers with a brownish red labellum with a network of darker veins.

== Description ==
Cryptostylis ovata is a terrestrial, perennial, deciduous, herb which usually grows in colonies although only a few plants may flower in any one year. It has one to several egg-shaped leaves 100–250 mm (4–10 in) long and 40–80 mm (2–3 in) wide on a petiole 30–60 mm (1–2 in) long. The leaves are dark green with a central white vein on the upper surface and purplish red below. This species is the only orchid in Western Australia to have leaves throughout the year. Between four and fifteen flowers 20–30 mm (0.8–1 in) long and 15–20 mm (0.6–0.8 in) wide are borne on a flower stem 250–700 mm (10–30 in) high. The sepals and petals are greenish yellow, the sepals 20–30 mm (0.8–1 in) long and 4–5 mm (0.16–0.20 in) wide and the petals shorter and narrower. The most prominent feature of the flower is its labellum which is 26–30 mm (1.0–1.2 in) long, 10–14 mm (0.4–0.6 in) wide when flattened, projects stiffly forwards and is reddish brown with a fine network of darker veins. Flowering occurs from November to February.

== Taxonomy and naming ==
Cryptostylis ovata was first formally described in 1810 by Robert Brown and the description was published in Prodromus Florae Novae Hollandiae et Insulae Van Diemen. The specific epithet (ovata) is a Latin word meaning "egg-shaped", referring to the shape of the leaves.

== Distribution and habitat ==
The slipper orchid is widespread and common in a wide range of habitats from coastal scrub to high rainfall forests. It is mainly found between Perth and Albany but sometimes further east, in the Esperance Plains, Jarrah Forest, Swan Coastal Plain and Warren biogeographic regions.
