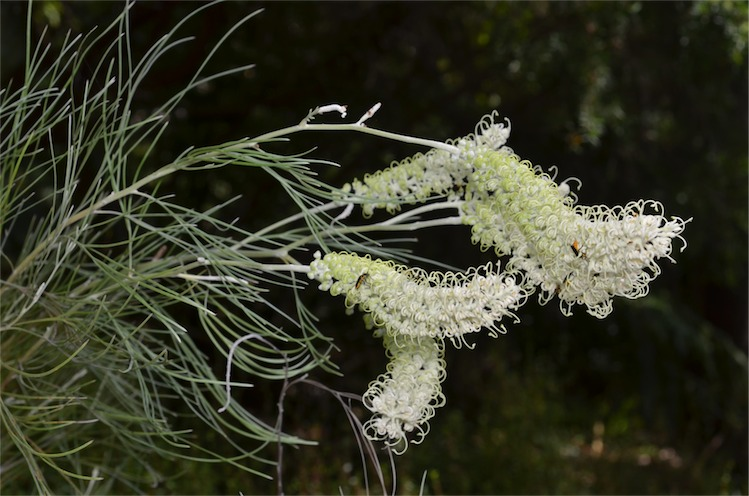
- In the Australian National Botanic Gardens

Conservation status
- Least Concern (IUCN 3.1)

Scientific classification
- Kingdom: Plantae
- Clade: Embryophytes
- Clade: Tracheophytes
- Clade: Spermatophytes
- Clade: Angiosperms
- Clade: Eudicots
- Order: Proteales
- Family: Proteaceae
- Genus: Grevillea
- Species: G. albiflora

Binomial name
- Grevillea albiflora McGill.

= Grevillea albiflora =

White spider flower

Species of shrub native to Australia

Grevillea albiflora, commonly known as white spider flower, is a species of flowering plant in the family Proteaceae and is endemic to inland eastern Australia. It is a shrub or small tree with pinnatisect leaves with linear lobes, and white to creamy-green flowers.

== Description ==
Grevillea albiflora is a shrub or sometimes a small tree, that typically grows to a height of 2–8 m (6 ft 7 in – 26 ft 3 in) with mostly smooth bark. Its leaves are 80–300 mm (3.1–11.8 in) long and usually pinnatisect with five to nine linear lobes 1–2 mm (0.039–0.079 in) wide, the edges rolled under as far as the mid-vein. The flowers are in dense, cylindrical groups 50–100 mm (2.0–3.9 in) long on the ends of branches and are fragrant and white to creamy-green. The perianth is softly-hairy on the outside and the pistil is 15–21.5 mm (0.59–0.85 in) long. Flowering mainly occurs from November to January and the fruit is velvety follicle 20–25 mm (0.79–0.98 in) long.

== Taxonomy ==
Grevillea albiflora was first formally described in 1944 by Cyril Tenison White in Proceedings of the Royal Society of Queensland from specimens collected near Cunnamulla in 1939 by Stanley Thatcher Blake. The specific epithet (albiflora) means "white-flowered".

== Distribution and habitat ==
White spider flower grows in deep red sand in two disjunct populations, one from near Uluru to Rainbow Valley in the southern Northern Territory and northern South Australia, and the other from near Cunnamulla and St George in Queensland to Bourke in New South Wales.

== Conservation status ==
Grevillea albiflora is listed as least concern on the IUCN Red List of Threatened Species. Although it has a relatively restricted range, there are no major threats to this species, and its population is unlikely to be declining.
