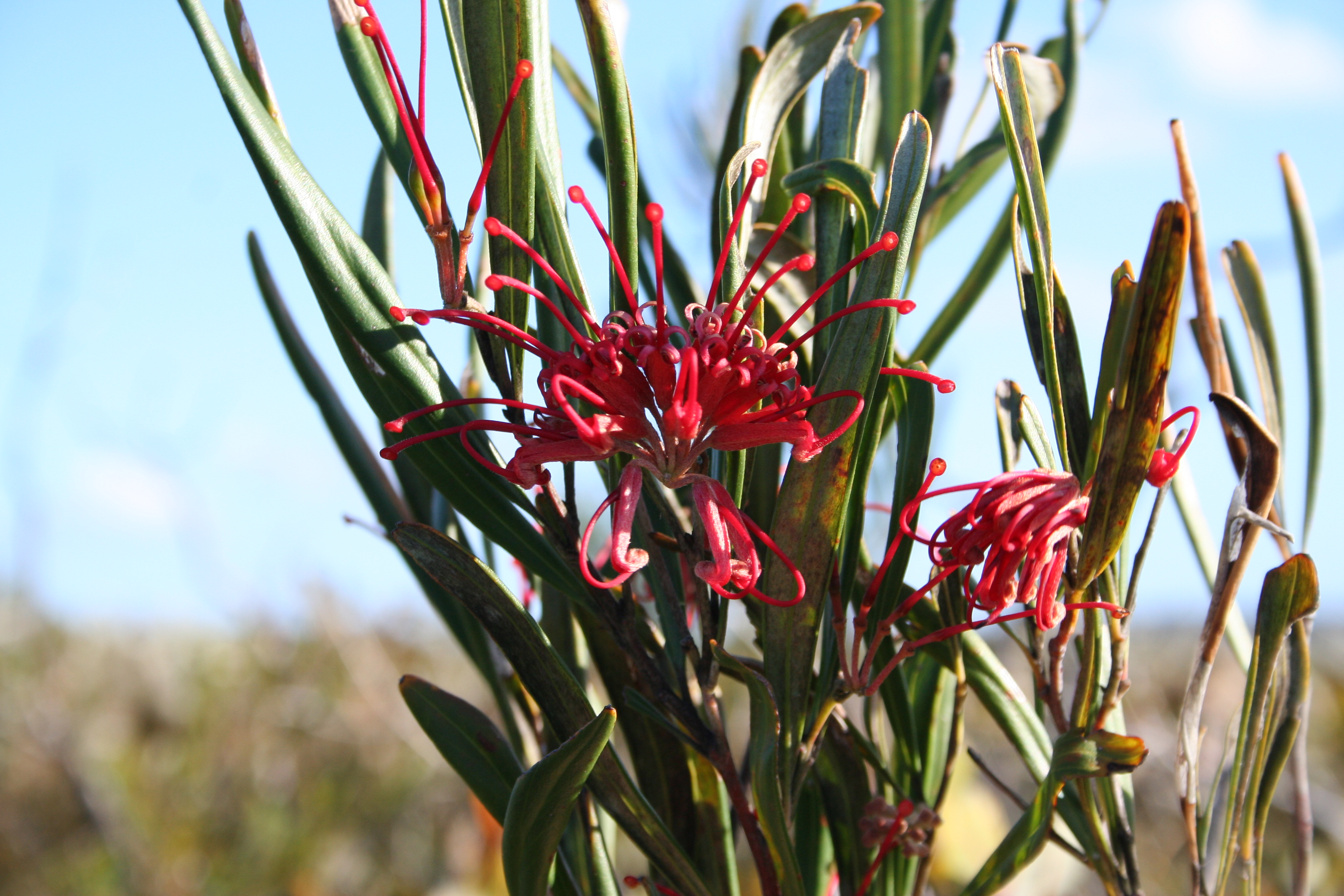
- Grevillea oleoides in Royal National Park

Conservation status
- Least Concern (IUCN 3.1)

Scientific classification
- Kingdom: Plantae
- Clade: Tracheophytes
- Clade: Angiosperms
- Clade: Eudicots
- Order: Proteales
- Family: Proteaceae
- Genus: Grevillea
- Species: G. oleoides

Binomial name
- Grevillea oleoides Sieber ex Schult. & Schult.f.

Synonyms
- List: Grevillea oleoides Sieber ex Schult. & Schult.f. subsp. oleoides; Grevillea oleoides Sieber ex Schult. & Schult.f. var. oleoides; Grevillea planifolia Lodd., G.Lodd. & W.Lodd. nom. inval., nom. nud.; Grevillea planifolia R.Br. ex Loudon nom. illeg.; Grevillea planifolia Loudon nom. inval., nom. nud.; Grevillea planifolia Meisn. nom. inval., pro syn.; Grevillea seymouriae Sweet; Grevillea seymouriae Meisn. nom. illeg.; Grevillea speciosa subsp. oleoides (Sieber ex Schult. & Schult.f.) McGill.; Hakea oleoides (Sieber ex Schult. & Schult.f.) Christenh. & Byng

= Grevillea oleoides =

Species of shrub endemic to New South Wales, Australia

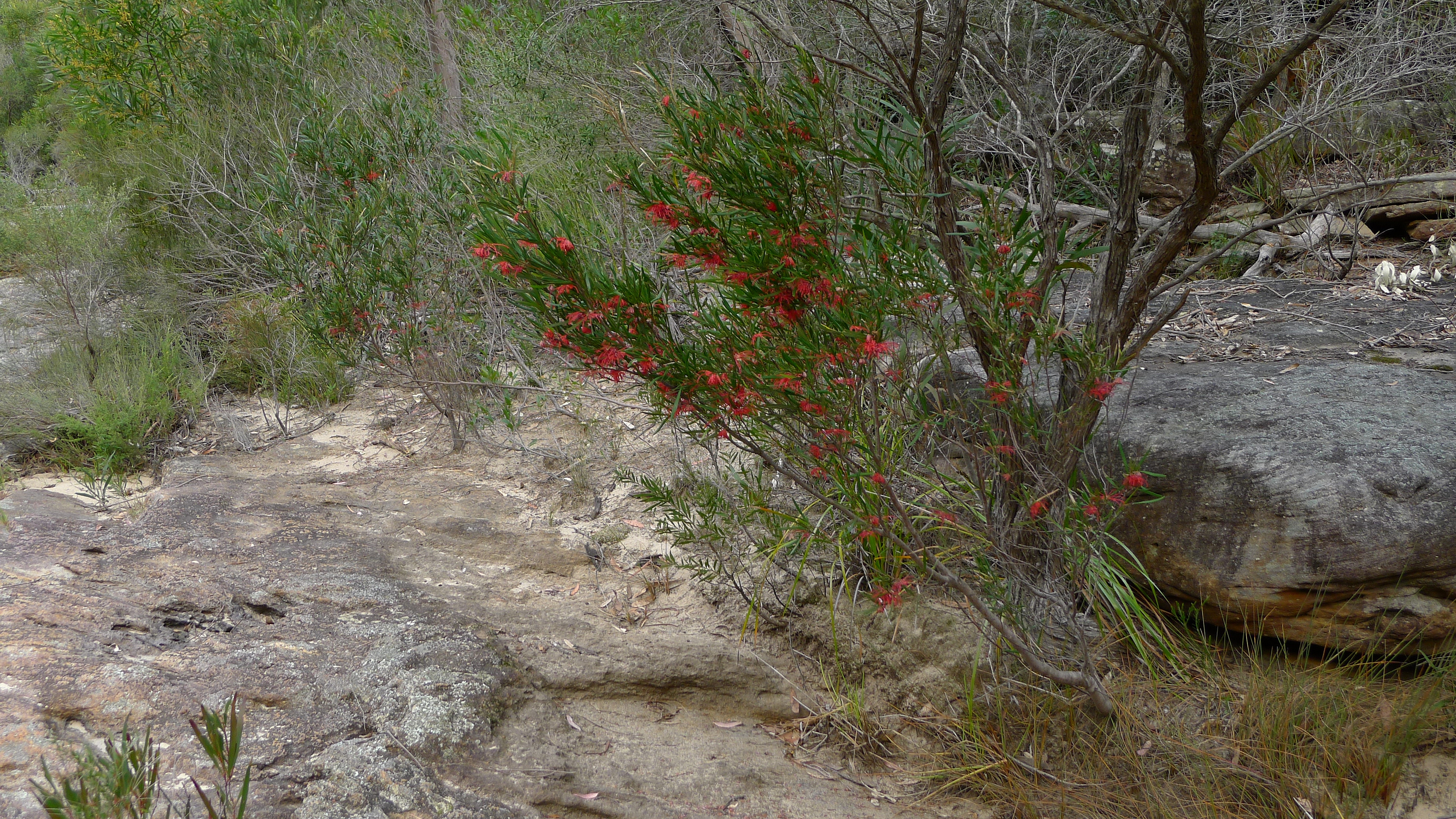
Habit in Heathcote National Park

Grevillea oleoides, also known as red spider flower, is a species of flowering plant in the family Proteaceae and is endemic to eastern New South Wales. It is an erect shrub with egg-shaped leaves, the narrower end towards the base, sometimes elliptic or linear leaves and red or reddish-pink flowers usually within the foliage.

== Description ==
Grevillea oleoides is an erect shrub that typically grows to a height of 0.5–3 m (1 ft 8 in – 9 ft 10 in) and has angular branchlets. Its leaves are usually egg-shaped with the narrower end towards the base, or narrowly elliptic to more or less linear, 50–140 mm (2.0–5.5 in) long and 2–20 mm (0.079–0.787 in) wide. The edges of the leaves are turned down or rolled under, the upper surface wrinkled and the lower surface covered with silky to woolly hairs. The flowers are usually arranged on the ends of branches in groups of 12 to 16 on a peduncle up to 5 mm (0.20 in) long, and are red or deep reddish-pink, occasionally pink, the pistil 27–36 mm (1.1–1.4 in) long. Flowering mainly occurs from August to November and the fruit is an elliptic follicle 10–15 mm (0.39–0.59 in) long.

== Taxonomy ==
Grevillea oleoides was first formally described in 1827 by Josef August Schultes and Julius Hermann Schultes in their book Mantissa in volumen primum [-tertium] :Systematis vegetabilium caroli a Linné from an unpublished description by Franz Sieber. The specific epithet (oleoides), means similar to the European olive, Olea europaea.

== Distribution ==
Red spider flower mainly occurs in the Sydney basin from Botany Bay and the Georges River to the northern Illawarra region, where it grows in dry sclerophyll woodland or heathland, often in moist locations near creeks or swamps.
