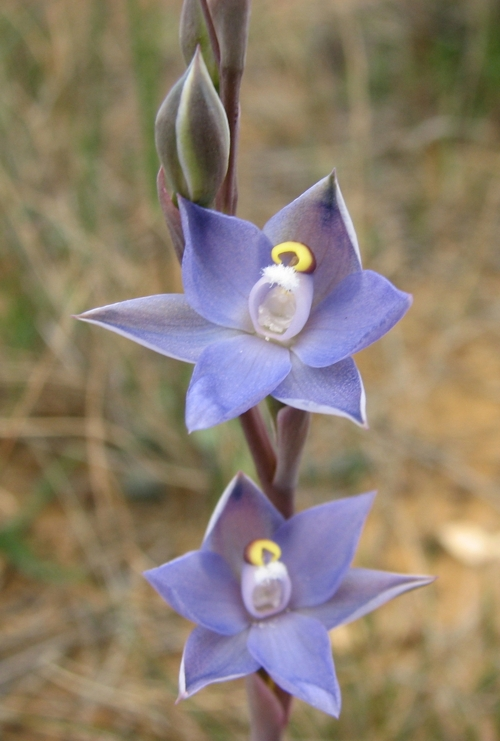
- Near Rokewood Junction, Victoria.

Scientific classification
- Kingdom: Plantae
- Clade: Tracheophytes
- Clade: Angiosperms
- Clade: Monocots
- Order: Asparagales
- Family: Orchidaceae
- Subfamily: Orchidoideae
- Tribe: Diurideae
- Genus: Thelymitra
- Species: T. pauciflora

Binomial name
- Thelymitra pauciflora R.Br.

= Thelymitra pauciflora =

Slender sun orchid

Species of orchid

Thelymitra pauciflora, commonly called the slender sun orchid in Australia and maikaika or maika in New Zealand is a species of orchid in the family Orchidaceae. It is one of the most widespread and common orchid species in Australia, growing in all states except Western Australia and the Northern Territory, and also in New Zealand including Chatham Island.

== Description ==
Thelymitra pauciflora is a terrestrial, tuberous herb growing up to 60 cm high when in flower. It has a single erect, fleshy leaf, 30 cm long by 6 mm wide, ribbed on the outer side and channelled on the inner. The leaf is tinged with purple, especially near the base and often spotted with rust. The flower stem has up to twelve flowers but only two or three open at a time. Each flower is 1.5–2.0 cm across, dark blue, mauve or magenta in colour in New Zealand but pale blue, rarely pink or white in Australia. The top of the column is yellow and the column arms have a mop-like tuft of white or mauve hairs. The flowers generally open only in warm weather. In Australia, flowers mostly appear from August to January and in New Zealand from November to January.

== Taxonomy and naming ==
The species was first formally described by botanist Robert Brown in 1810 in Prodromus Florae Novae Hollandiae. The specific epithet (pauciflora) is derived from Latin, paucus, "few" and flos, "flower".

== Distribution and habitat ==
Thelymitra pauciflora occurs in the Australian Capital Territory and all states of Australia except Western Australia and Northern Territory. In Australia it grows in sclerophyll forest, woodland and heath. It also occurs in New Zealand where it grows in open areas amongst scrub, clay banks, open grassland and from lowlands to low montane.
