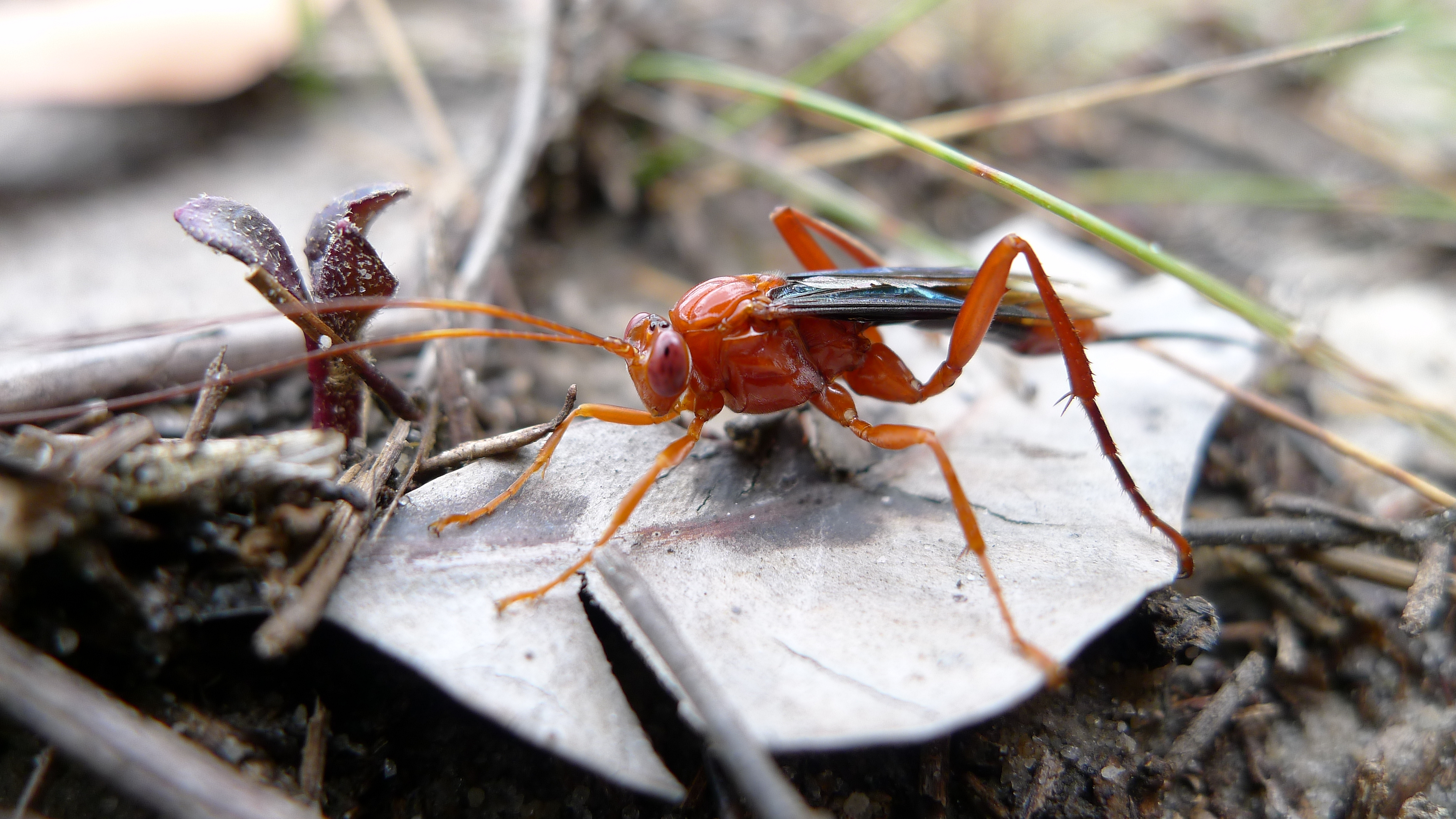

Scientific classification
- Kingdom: Animalia
- Phylum: Arthropoda
- Class: Insecta
- Order: Hymenoptera
- Family: Ichneumonidae
- Genus: Lissopimpla
- Species: L. excelsa

Binomial name
- Lissopimpla excelsa (Costa, 1864)

Synonyms
- Lissopimpla semipunctata Kirby; Lissopimpla octo-guttata Kriechb.

= Lissopimpla excelsa =

Species of wasp

Lissopimpla excelsa, commonly known as the orchid dupe wasp, is a wasp of the family Ichneumonidae native to Australia. Although also found in New Zealand, where it is known as the dusky-winged ichneumonid, it has probably been introduced there. However, another source states that it may be native to New Zealand.

It pollinates all five Australian members of the orchid genus Cryptostylis. The male wasp mistakes the flower parts for a female wasp and attempts to copulate with it. Although the different species can occur together, they appear to inhibit cross-fertilisation and no hybrids are found in nature. This discovery was made by Australian naturalist Edith Coleman in 1928. The term "pseudocopulation" has since been coined to describe the phenomenon. The mimicking of flowers to resemble female wasp parts has since been recorded in other orchid genera.

Although termed pseudocopulation, vigorous copulation does occur, and the male wasp ejaculates enough so that the emissions are visible to the naked eye on the flower parts. A 2008 field study showed these to contain wasp sperm. The flowers of Cryptostylis orchids and female wasp body parts are very similar in colour when viewed under a hymenopteran visual system, despite looking unlike to human eyes. Although the colours that ichneumon wasps see are unknown, bees and wasps have similar perception with green, blue and ultraviolet wavelengths. The Cryptostylis flowers have no smell detectable to humans, but have been shown to have an odour which attracts the wasp. Pseudocopulation with the orchid Cryptostylis subulata occurs in New Zealand.

The orchid dupe wasp was first described by Italian entomologist Achille Costa in 1864 as Pimpla excelsa, before being placed in (and becoming the type species of) the new genus Lissopimpla in 1889 by Joseph Kriechbaumer, who called it Lissopimpla octo-guttata Kriechb. It was also known for many years as Lissopimpla semipunctata, however Costa's name has priority and hence is the correct name. The head, mesosoma, legs and apical segments of the metasoma are red-brown, the first four segments of the metasoma are black with paired large white spots, and the wings are a dark smoky brown except at the apex of the fore wings. Like all members of its family, L. excelsa is parasitic. One species it preys upon is the noctuid moth pest species Helicoverpa armigera.
