= Robert John Bates =

Australian botanist, plant collector, and illustrator

- Born: 1946 (age 79–80); Australia
- Scientific career
- Fields: Botany
- Institutions: Adelaide; regional South Australia
- Author abbrev. (botany): R.J. Bates

Robert J. "Rob" Bates (born 1946) is an Australian botanist, plant collector, and illustrator.

== Biography ==
Bates grew up in Mylor, South Australia, and has been living in Fairview Park, Adelaide for more than 40 years.

Professionally, Bates is primarily known for his interest in spermatophytes, in particular, the study of South Australian orchids, where he has described at least 68 species.

== Publications ==
His publications include:

- 1978. Pollination of orchids – Part 9. Self pollination. Journal of the Native Orchid Society of South Australia 3, 7–8.
- 1982. Observations of pollen vectors on Caladenia congesta. Journal of the Native Orchid Society of South Australia 6, 37–38.
- 1984a. The ecology and biology of Caladenia rigida (Orchidaceae). South Australian Naturalist 56–59, 63–65. 58,
- 1984b. Pollination of Caladenia: an overview. Orchadian 7, 269–270.
- 1984c. The genus Microtis. (Orchidaceae). A Taxonomic revision with notes on Biology. Journal of the Adelaide Botanic Gardens. 7, 45–89.
- 1985a. Checklist of Australian Terrestrial Orchid Hybrids. Journal of the Native Orchid Society of South Australia
- 1985b. Colourful Thelymitra hybrids. Orchadian 8, 119–121.
- 1990. (with J.Z. Weber) Orchids of South Australia. Handbook of the Flora and Fauna of South Australia.
- 1991 (with D.L. Jones) Australian Orchid Research 2: 77.
- 1995. The species of Wurmbea (Liliaceae) in South Australia. Journal of the Adelaide Botanic Gardens 16.
- 1996. Little known South Australian Spider Orchids. Orchadian 12, 29–32.
- 1999. Self pollinated sun orchids of the Thelymitra pauciflora – T. longifolia alliance in Australia. The Orchadian, 13(2): 65–68.
- 2007. A review of South Australian Wurmbea (Colchicaceae-Liliaceae): keys, new taxa and combinations, and notes. Journal of the Adelaide Botanic Gardens 21.
- 2008. New combinations in Pterostylis and Caladenia and other name changes in the Orchidaceae of South Australia. Journal of the Adelaide Botanic Gardens. 22.
- 2010 The Thelymitra pauciflora R.Br. complex (Orchidaceae) in South Australia with the description of seven new taxa. Journal of the Adelaide Botanic Gardens. 24.

The standard author abbreviation R.J.Bates is used to indicate this person as the author when citing a botanical name.

== See also ==
- Pollination of orchids
