= Blue Lady =

Blue Lady may refer to:

- "Blue Lady" (song), a song by Hello Sailor
- "Blue Lady", a song by Labi Siffre from Crying Laughing Loving Lying
- Blue lady orchid (Thelymitra crinita), a species endemic to Australia
- SS Blue Lady, originally SS France, an ocean liner
- (Untitled) Blue Lady, a sculpture by Navjot Altaf

== See also ==
- Blue Lady's War, a fictional war in the Dragonlance novels
- Lady Blue (disambiguation)
