= Maxime Old =

French architect and furniture designer (1910–1991)

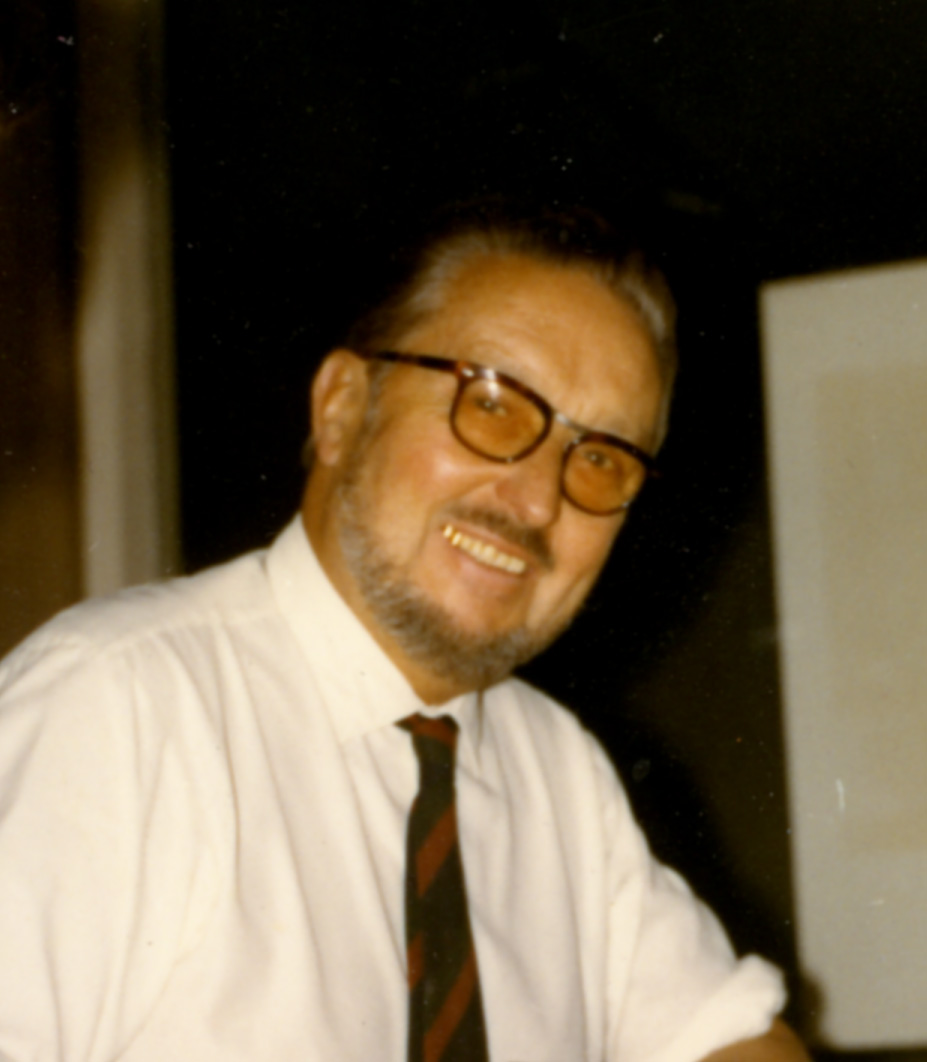
- Fonds documentaire Maxime Old
- Born: December 13, 1910; Maisons-Alfort, near Paris, France
- Died: November 16, 1991 (aged 80); Paris, France
- Resting place: Maisons-Alfort, near Paris, France
- Education: école Boulle
- Known for: Interior Architecture, Art Furniture Design
- Notable work: SS France (1961) (First class lounge), Brussels World's Fair, (1958, Hotel Pavillon de France), 1939 New York World's Fair (Pavillon de France), ...
- Style: Art Deco, Modern architecture
- Movement: Bauhaus, Société des artistes décorateurs, The French Union of Modern Artists
- Spouse: Isabelle Duchesne
- Awards: Legion of Honour; 1954 Chevalier, French Academy of Arts and Letters; 1965 Chevalier
- Patrons: Émile-Jacques Ruhlmann
- Website: www.maximeold.com/en/maxime-old-reference-site/

Maxime Old (1910–1991) was a French interior architect and furniture designer. He is known for his numerous works of art, and as forerunner of the transition from the style of the 1930's to modern design. Yves Badetz, chief curator at the Orsay Museum, in charge of decorative arts, confesses that “The emotions you feel when looking at Maxime Old’s creations are intense. His thoughtful esthetics freely associates the values of the rational of Bauhaus with Ruhlmann's demand for perfection. His talent was to design the refined outlines anticipating the third millennium."

== Biography ==
=== Family History ===
Maxime Old was born in Maisons-Alfort (Val-de-Marne) in 1910. He came from a long line of master cabinetmakers. His father, Louis Old is the son of Jean Léonard (Johann Leonhard) Old, Germany originated, master cabinetmaker. Louis marries Maximillienne, daughter of Joseph (Giuseppe) Carosi, master cabinetmaker, originated from Italy. Working as a team, they decided to fuse the two workshops together to make 37 Rue Chanzy Paris, a workshop that Louis Old would then manage himself. With the help of his spouse and approximately 15 employees at the time, Louis Old realised furniture in order to be sold to furniture stores, as well as individuals.

=== Education ===
After studying four years at l’Ecole Boulle, Maxime Old graduated top of the year and transferred directly to Jacques-Emile Ruhlmann's design team, where he collaborated until the end in 1934. These two learning experiences gave him a different perspective, installed a certain demanding nature in him, new techniques, and knowledge, that would then help him transform the family business into a world-renowned decorative art name.

=== Initial works and recognition ===
In 1934, when J.E. Rulhman died, his company is closed by his order. His customers in contact with Maxime asked him to continue to work for them. Maxime went back to his family cabinetmaker workshop and turned it around to satisfy this demanding private customer base. Maxime Old reportedly developed an elegant, modern style that fit with the demanding requests of his clientele: Industries, politicians, lawyers, doctors and similar professions. He designed and produced art furniture embedded in interior architecture innovative master plans.

He is particularly known for his elegant transformative pieces of furniture. He has been said to be the "sofabed inventor"

In 1939, Maxime Old exhibited his works at the International Exhibition New-York World's Fair.

Until the 1960s, he participated in all of the « Artistes Decorateurs » and "Salons des Arts Ménagers" exhibitions, where many of his art pieces were awarded. This success led to the grand opening of his gallery on Avenue Hoche in Paris, where he exhibited his art and helped young prodigies be recognized by the art world.

Several schools, such as the "Ecole Nationale Supérieure des Arts Decoratifs" requested his teaching in art furniture design, he headed the decorative architecture Ph.D of the school.

=== Institutional works ===
More and more, simultaneously to his production for private customers, Maxime Old developed his interior architect activity focused on institutional large customers: prestigious ocean liners such as the "SS France (1961)", embassies, famous hotels, large company headquarters, business banks, airports, city halls and even presidential palaces, both in France and in other countries.

For these large projects he provides both the overall interior master plan and the all individual pieces of furniture of his own design. He experiences innovative techniques and new materials beside traditional ones to achieve creative functional designs. The professional press points out the consistency of these major work of art.

Maxime was awarded Chevalier of the French Academy of Arts and Letters, the equivalent to the American Academy of Arts and Letters.

In 1954, he was awarded Chevalier of the Legion of Honour.

In 1958, he became the head of the French hotel trade pavilion interior design for the Universal Exhibition "Brussels World's Fair". His work was awarded "Grand Prix".

== Significant works ==
=== Shows & Events ===
International Exhibition 1939 : New-York World's Fair

International Exhibition 1958 : Brussels World's Fair

From the 30s to the 60s, Old was present in almost every single « Salon des Artistes Decorateurs, » the most famous art furniture exhibit in France at this time.

From the 50s to the 60s, Salon des Arts Ménagers, modern & functional housing exhibition in Paris

=== Ocean liners ===
SS Atlantique, SS La Marseillaise, SS Île-de-France, SS Liberté, SS Antilles, SS Flandre, SS Ville de Marseille, SS Ville de Tunis, SS France (1961), SS Ancerville

=== Embassies and Palaces ===
Foreign Office France, French embassies in : Oslo (Norway), La Haye (Netherlands), Ottawa (Canada), Ghana, Helsinki (Finland)

President H. Bourguiba Palace (Tunisia), Mohammed V of Morocco Palace (Morocco)

=== Banks & Companies headquarters ===
Société des Forges Le Creusot, Framatome, Régie Autonome des Pétroles, Compagnie Française du Raffinage, Caisse Centrale du Crédit Immobilier et Commercial, Banque de l'Union Européenne

=== Hotels ===
Marhaba Hotel in Casablanca (Morocco), El Aurassi à Alger (Algeria), Le Fort Royal à Deshaies (Guadeloupe), Frantel Paris-Orly

=== Other major projects ===
Marseille air-port (1961), Paris-Orsay Science University, the Hôtel de Ville in Rouen.

== Bibliography ==
Yves Badetz, Maxime Old Architecte-Décorateur, Editions Norma, 2000 (ISBN 2909283488), read on line

Elisabeth Védrenne, Les 50 glorieuses de Maxime Old, Le journal des Arts.fr - l'Oeil, 2000, preview on line

Lorraine Tissier-Rebour, Art history master thesis : Maxime Old : Une inventivité et un savoir-faire à la rencontre de la modernité, Paris-Sorbonne University, 2014, read on line

Armelle Bouchet-Mazas, Le Paquebot France, Editions Norma 2006, preview on line

René Chavance, Bibliothèque Nationale de France, Art et décoration 1937, preview on line

Pierre Kjellberg, Le mobilier du XX siècle, Dictionnaire des créateurs, Editions de l'Amateur, 1994, preview on line
