= Camille Hilaire =

French artist (1916–2004)

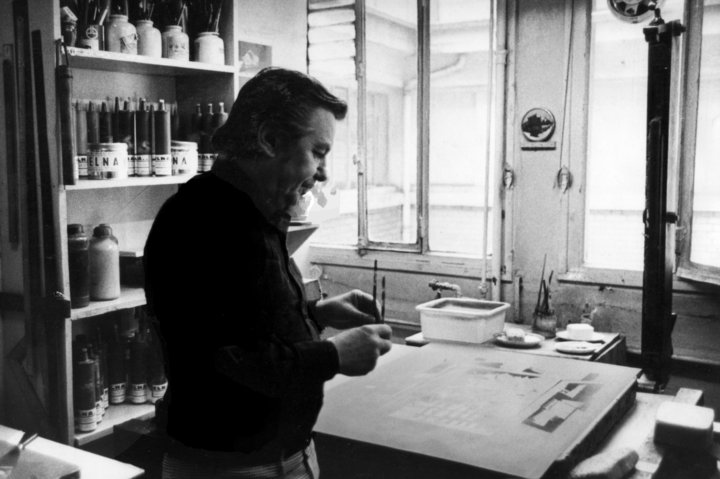
- Born: 2 August 1916; Metz, France
- Died: 7 June 2004 (aged 87)
- Education: École des Beaux-Arts
- Movement: Cubism
- Spouses: Anne-Marie Reslinger; Simone Jance-Hilaire
- Website: www.camillehilaire.fr

Camille Hilaire (2 August 1916 – 7 June 2004) was a French painter and weaver from Metz. He attended the École des Beaux-Arts in Paris during World War II and was also tutored by André Lhote.

== Career ==
Hilaire began painting from a young age. At the age of fifteen, he discovered the work of Albrecht Dürer in the Metz city library and began making copies of it. Some drawings he had had displayed in a bookshop drew the attention of Jean Giono and Nicolas Untersteller, the director of the École des Beaux-Arts in Paris. He later enrolled at Beaux-Arts.

In 1933–1934, Hilaire travelled around Spain and Italy, with help of a scholarship, drawing inspiration from the art he encountered. Both his painting and tapestry were influenced by the places he visited.

He was drafted into the army and participated in the campaign of France. He was taken prisoner, escaped, and returned to Paris in early 1941. Wanting to hide his identity, he enrolled under a false name at the École des Beaux-Arts in Paris during the occupation.

In 1942–1943, while remaining at Beaux-Arts, he came under the tutelage of the Cubist artist André Lhote, with whom he became friends, and soon after his assistant. Hilaire's painting reveals influences from Cubism.

He was then appointed professor of Beaux-Arts in Nancy, where he taught from 1947 to 1958, and then Paris until 1968.

He was awarded the Prix de Venise in 1948 and the Prix de la Casa de Velázquez in 1950.

He held his first exhibition in Paris in 1951 at the Gallerie Valloton. He then exhibited at the preeminent international art fairs in Geneva, Cannes and Deauville.

One of the interior walls of the canteen of the collège Georges-de-La-Tour, at place du Roi-George in Metz, is decorated with a bucolic fresco painted by Camille Hilaire. It was saved during modernization of the building.

Over time, a dozen monographs have been devoted to him as well as documentaries and films. He left a large body of work. Hilaire has strongly influenced the French painters of the mid-twentieth century.

== Personal life ==
He was married in 1934 to Anne-Marie Reslinger, with whom he had a daughter, Jeannine. In 1942, he married Simone Jance, a fellow student of art, with whom he had four children: Christiane, Pascale, Claude, a painter going by the name of Hastaire, and Florence, painter and sculptor with the pseudonym Cantié-Kramer.

== Works ==
=== Illustrated books ===
From 1972 to 1994, Hilaire produced six limited edition books containing original lithographs:

- 1972: Femmes
- 1974: Le Cirque
- 1975: Où passent nos rivières
- 1976: La Normandie
- 1977: Jardins
- 1994: Méditerranéennes

Hilaire made twelve illustrations for Pierre Louÿs's 1973 book Poemes libres, the fifth of the six volumes of Chefs-d'oeuvre de Pierre Louÿs.

=== Tapestries ===
The SS France displayed a number of tapestries, including two by Hilaire in the first-class Salon Fontainebleau: Sous-bois, a 18 m^{2} (190 sq ft) work, and Forêt de France.
