= Lady Blue =

Lady Blue may refer to:

- Lady Blue (anime), a 4-episode OVA in the anime series La Blue Girl
- Lady Blue, a fictional character in The Animals of Farthing Wood (TV series)
- Lady Blue (TV series), an American crime drama starring Jamie Rose
- "Lady Blue" (song), a song by Leon Russell on the album Will O' the Wisp
- "Lady Blue", a song by Enrique Bunbury on Flamingos (album)

== See also ==
- Blue Lady (disambiguation)
