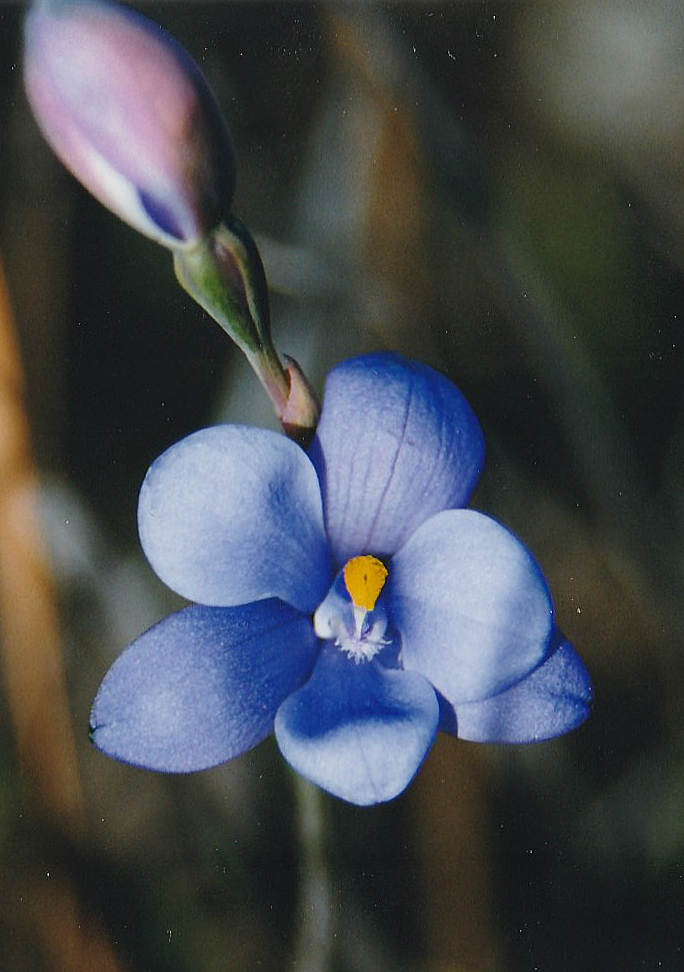
- Near Ravensthorpe

Scientific classification
- Kingdom: Plantae
- Clade: Embryophytes
- Clade: Tracheophytes
- Clade: Angiosperms
- Clade: Monocots
- Order: Asparagales
- Family: Orchidaceae
- Subfamily: Orchidoideae
- Tribe: Diurideae
- Genus: Thelymitra
- Species: T. cornicina

Binomial name
- Thelymitra cornicina Rchb.f.

Synonyms
- Thelymitra fasciculata Fitzg.

= Thelymitra cornicina =

Lilac sun orchid

Species of orchid

Thelymitra cornicina, commonly called lilac sun orchid, is a species of orchid in the family Orchidaceae and is endemic to the south-west of Western Australia. It has a single narrow, pale green leaf and up to eight lilac-tinged blue flowers with the lobe on top of the anther covered with short, finger-like calli.

== Description ==
Thelymitra cornicina is a tuberous, perennial herb with a single pale green leaf 100–200 mm (4–8 in) long and 3–5 mm (0.1–0.2 in) wide. Up to eight pale blue to dark blue flowers with a lilac tinge, 25–30 mm (0.98–1.2 in) wide are borne on a flowering stem 200–500 mm (8–20 in) tall. The sepals and petals are 10–15 mm (0.4–0.6 in) long and 6–8 mm (0.2–0.3 in) wide. The column is blue with a yellow crest, 3.5–4.5 mm (0.1–0.2 in) long and about 2 mm (0.08 in) wide. The lobe on the top of the anther is short and densely covered with short, finger-like yellow glands. The side lobes have mop-like tufts of a few white to lilac hairs. The flowers are insect pollinated and open on sunny days. Flowering occurs from September to November.

== Taxonomy and naming ==
Thelymitra cornicina was first formally described in 1871 by Heinrich Gustav Reichenbach and the description was published in Beitrage zur Systematischen Pflanzenkunde. The specific epithet (cornicina) means "horn-blower", hence "horn-shaped", referring to the column.

== Distribution and habitat ==
Lilac sun orchid grows in scrubland and forest between Perth and Hopetoun in the Esperance Plains, Jarrah Forest, Swan Coastal Plain and Warren biogeographic regions.

== Conservation ==
Thelymitra cornicina is classified as "not threatened" in Western Australia by the Western Australian Government Department of Parks and Wildlife.
