= SS France (1960) =

Ocean liner and cruise ship from 1962 to 2005

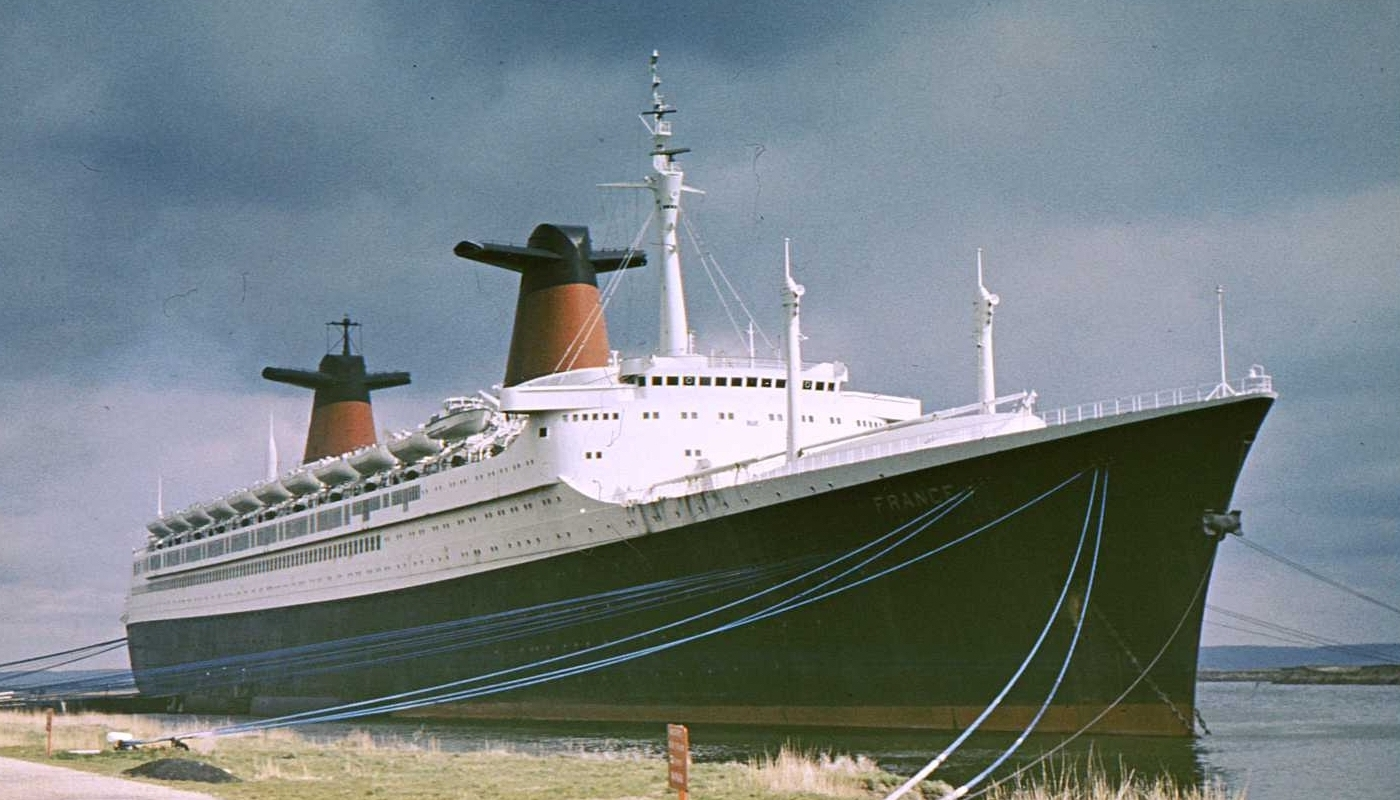
- SS France laid up in Le Havre, 1978

History

France
- Name: SS France
- Namesake: Country of France
- Owner: Compagnie Générale Transatlantique (French Line)
- Operator: Compagnie Generale Transatlantique (French Line)
- Port of registry: Le Havre, France
- Route: Le Havre–Southampton-New York
- Ordered: 26 July 1956
- Builder: Chantiers de l'Atlantique
- Yard number: G19
- Laid down: 7 October 1957
- Launched: 11 May 1960
- Christened: 11 May 1960; by Yvonne de Gaulle
- Decommissioned: 25 October 1974
- Maiden voyage: 3 February 1962
- In service: 1962–1974
- Out of service: 24 October 1974
- Identification: IMO number: 5119143
- Fate: Sold to Norwegian Cruise Line after 5 years out of service

Norway
- Name: SS Norway (1980–2006); SS Blue Lady (2006–2008)
- Namesake: Country of Norway
- Owner: Norwegian Cruise Line
- Port of registry: Oslo, Norway (1980–1987); Nassau, Bahamas (1987–2003)
- Route: Miami, Key West, Cozumel, Roatán, Great Stirrup Cay, Miami, and also European cruises
- Ordered: 26 June 1979
- Builder: Lloyd Werft (Refitting for Cruising Duties)
- Christened: 3 May 1980 by King Olav V
- Completed: 3 May 1980
- Acquired: 26 June 1979
- Decommissioned: 23 May 2005
- Maiden voyage: 6 May 1980
- In service: 1980–2003
- Out of service: 25 May 2003 (Boiler explosion)
- Identification: Call sign: LITA; IMO number: 5119143
- Fate: Scrapped 2006

General characteristics
- Class & type: Ocean Liner (1962-1974) Cruise Ship (1979-2003)
- Tonnage: 66,343 GRT, 37,063 NRT (1961); 70,202 GRT, 38,573 NRT (1980); 76,049 GRT, 45,886 NRT (1990)
- Displacement: 52,646 tonnes (51,815 long tons)
- Length: 315.66 m (1,035 ft 8 in) overall; 299.22 m (981 ft 8 in) waterline
- Beam: 33.70 m (110 ft 7 in) (1961); 33.81 m (110 ft 11 in) (1990)
- Height: 67.66 m (222 ft 0 in) keel to mast
- Draft: 10.49 m (34 ft 5 in) design
- Depth: 28.10 m (92.2 ft) keel to main deck
- Decks: 12 (1961); 13 (1980); 15 (1990)
- Installed power: 160,000 HP (1961, total); 80,000 HP (1980, total); 54,000 HP (1980, propulsion)
- Propulsion: Geared CEM-Parsons turbines; quadruple propeller (1961–1979); / twin propeller (1979–2008)
- Speed: 30 kn (56 km/h; 35 mph) approx.
- Capacity: 1961–1974; First class: 407–617; Tourist class: 1,271–1,637; 1980–1990 – 1,944 passengers; 1994–2003 – 2,565 passengers
- Crew: 1961–1974 – 1,104–1,253; 1980–1990 – 875; 1994–2003 – 875
- Notes: Cost US$80 million approx.

SS France was a Compagnie Générale Transatlantique (CGT, or French Line) ocean liner, constructed by the Chantiers de l'Atlantique shipyard at Saint-Nazaire, France, and put into service in February 1962. From the time of her construction in 1960 until the construction of the 345 m (1,132 ft) RMS Queen Mary 2 in 2004, the 316 m (1,037 ft) vessel was the longest passenger ship ever built. France was purchased by Norwegian Cruise Line (NCL) in 1979, renamed SS Norway, and underwent significant modifications to refit her for cruising. She was later renamed SS Blue Lady preparatory to scrapping, sold to be scrapped in 2005, with scrapping completed in late 2008.

== Characteristics ==
France was the French Line flagship from 1961 to 1974, combining regular five days/nights transatlantic crossings with occasional winter cruises, as well as two world circumnavigations. During her last years as a liner, to save fuel costs, crossings took six days/nights.

Some, like ship historian John Maxtone-Graham, believe that France was purposely built to serve as both a liner and a cruise ship, stating: "Once again, the company had cruise conversion in mind... for cruises, all baffle doors segregating staircases from taboo decks were opened to permit free circulation throughout the vessel." However, others, such as ship historian William Miller, have asserted that France was the "last purposely designed year-round transatlantic supership."

== History ==
=== Concept and construction ===
France was constructed to replace the line's other ageing ships including SS Ile de France and SS Liberté, which were outdated by the 1950s. Without these vessels the French Line could not compete against their rivals, most notably the Cunard Line, which also had plans for constructing a new modern liner. It was rumoured that this ship would be a 75,000-ton replacement for their ships RMS Queen Mary and RMS Queen Elizabeth. (This ship would eventually be the 68,000-ton Queen Elizabeth 2.) Further, the United States Lines had put into service in 1952 SS United States, which had broken all speed records on her maiden voyage, with an average speed of 35.59 knots (65.91 km/h; 40.96 mph).

At first, the idea of two 35,000-ton running mates was considered to replace Ile de France and Liberté. Charles de Gaulle, later President of France, opined that it would be better for French national pride, then flagging due to the then ongoing Algerian War of Independence, to construct one grand ocean liner, in the tradition of SS Normandie, as an ocean-going showcase for France. The idea of such a publicly funded liner was controversial, leading to raucous debates in the French parliament. The dealing lasted three and a half years, and though the letter commissioning the construction was finally signed by the Chairman of the Compagnie Générale Transatlantique, Jean Marie, on 25 July 1956, debate about the form, cost and construction schedule for France went on for a further year.

Beyond the luxuries, the French Line had to also face the realities that transatlantic passenger trade was forecast to decline due to increased air travel. Also, ship operating costs were increasing, mostly due to the price of crude oil. Consequently, the new ship would be larger than Ile, but smaller and cheaper to operate than Normandie. She would also only be a two-class liner, which would, like the recently built SS Rotterdam, be able to be converted from a segregated, class-restricted crossing mode to a unified, classless cruising mode, thereby allowing the ship to be more versatile in its operations. Despite these requirements, she was still to be the longest ship ever built, as well as one of the fastest, meaning not only an advanced propulsion system, but also a hull design which would withstand the rigours of the North Atlantic at high speed.

Hull G19 was built by Chantiers de l'Atlantique shipyard, in Saint-Nazaire, France, her keel being laid down on 7 October 1957. She was built in a pioneering manner: rather than constructing a skeleton which was then covered in steel hull plating, large parts of the ship were prefabricated in other cities (including Orléans, Le Havre and Lyon). The hull was fully welded, leading to weight savings, and two sets of stabilisers were fitted.

She was blessed by the Bishop of Nantes, Monseigneur Villepelet, and launched on 11 May 1960, at 4:15 pm, by Yvonne de Gaulle, wife of the president, and was named France, in honour both of the country and of the two previous CGT ships to bear the name. By 4:22 pm France was afloat and under command of tugs. President De Gaulle was in attendance at the launch, and gave a speech, announcing that France had been given a new Normandie, able to compete with Cunard's Queens, and the Blue Riband was within their reach. In reality, however, the 35 knots (65 km/h; 40 mph) speed of United States could not be beaten.

After the launch, the propellers were installed (the entire process taking over three weeks), the distinctive funnels affixed to the upper decks, the superstructure completed, life boats placed in their davits, and the interiors fitted out. France then undertook her sea trials on 19 November 1961, and averaged an unexpected 35.21 knots (65.21 km/h; 40.52 mph). With the French Line satisfied, the ship was handed over, and undertook a trial cruise to the Canary Islands with a full complement of passengers and crew. During this short trip she met, at sea, Liberté which was on her way to the shipbreakers.

=== Service history as France ===
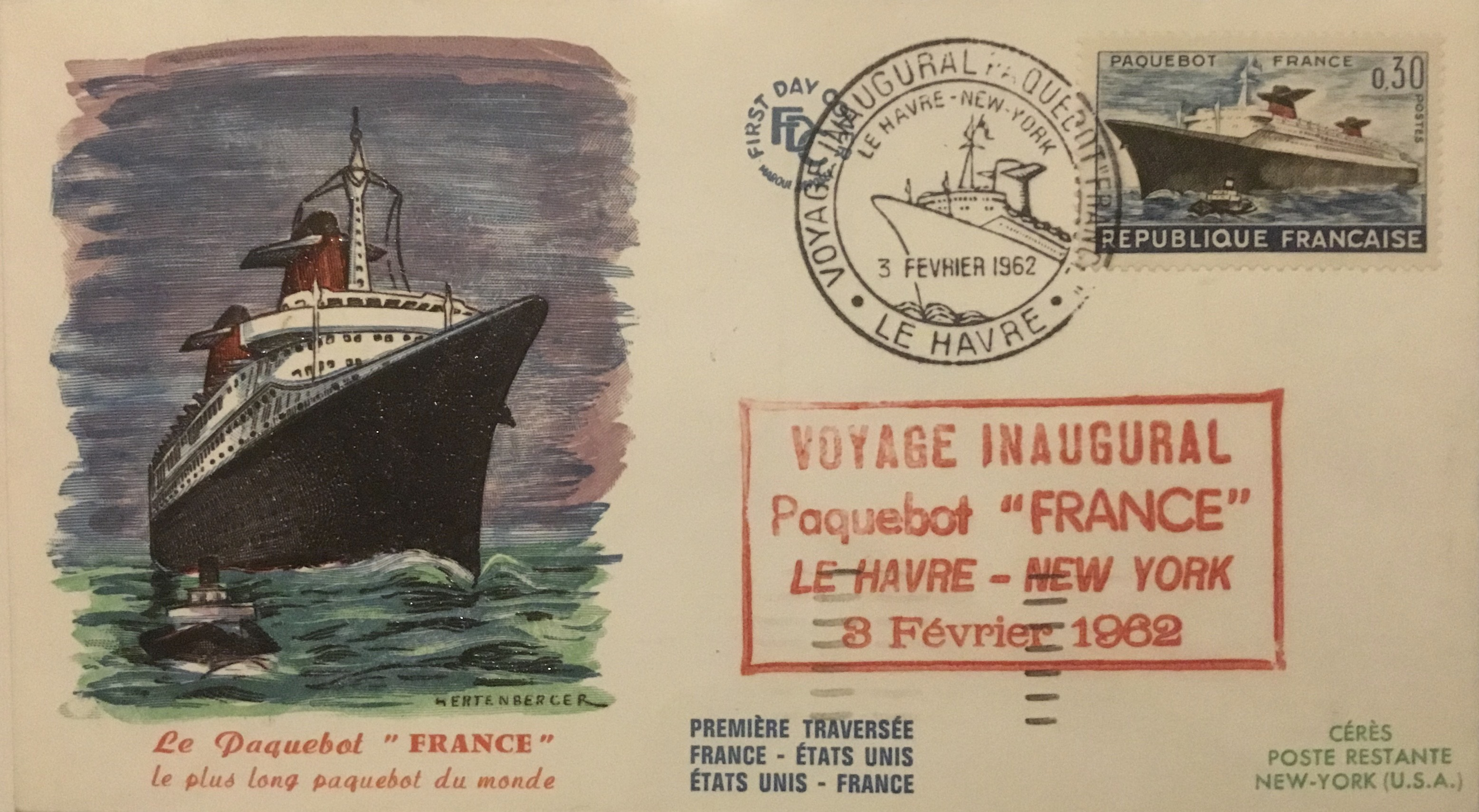
Maiden voyage cover.

France's maiden voyage from Le Havre to New York via Southampton, took place on 3 February 1962, with many of France's film stars and aristocracy aboard.

On 14 December 1962, France carried the Mona Lisa from Le Havre to New York, where the painting was to embark on an American tour.

SS France

Poster advertising France's 1965 Christmas and New Year's cruise to the West African coast.

She sailed the North Atlantic run between Le Havre and New York for thirteen years. But, by the beginning of the 1970s, far faster, and increasingly more comfortable and fuel-efficient commercial jet aircraft such as the Boeing 707, DC-8, and Boeing 747 had made long-distance transoceanic air travel more popular than the ocean liners, putting financial stress on European ship lines like the CGT that had derived much of their revenue from the trans-Atlantic market. Owing to this shift in trans-Atlantic travel trends, France was forced to take increasing advantage of subsidies from the French government.

Using the ship's versatile design to its full potential, the CGT began to send France on cruises in winter, which was off-season for the Atlantic trade. One design flaw was revealed when the ship reached warmer waters: her two swimming pools, one each for first and tourist class, were both indoors; the first class pool deep within the ship's hull, and the tourist class pool on an upper deck, but covered with an immovable glass dome. The latter, perhaps, was the more aggravating in hot weather. She also had limited outdoor deck space, with much of what was available protected behind thick glass wind-screens, useful on the North Atlantic, but frustrating when blocking cooling breezes in the tropics.

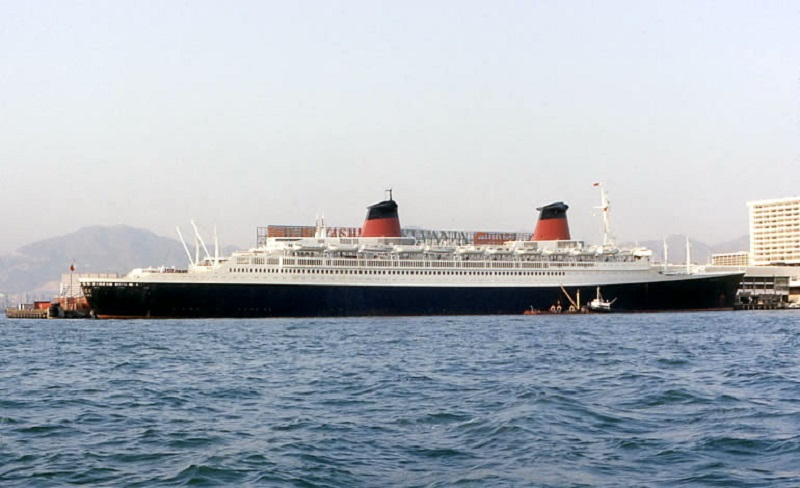
France docked in Hong Kong, February 1974

Nonetheless, France's cruises were popular, and her first world cruise took place in 1972. Too large to traverse the Panama and Suez Canals, she was forced to sail around Cape Horn and the Cape of Good Hope. That same year, with the destruction of the Seawise University (former RMS Queen Elizabeth) by fire in Hong Kong, France became the largest passenger ship in service in the world.

As the opening years of the decade progressed, the cruise market expanded, seeing the construction of smaller, purpose-built cruise ships which could pass through the Panama Canal. In the 1973 oil crisis the price of oil went from US$3 to $12 per barrel. When the French government, at the end of the Trente Glorieuses, realised that keeping France running would necessitate an additional ten million dollars a year, it opted instead to subsidize the then Concorde supersonic aircraft currently in development. Without this government money, the French Line could not operate, and it was announced that France would be withdrawn from service on 25 October 1974.

In response the crew decided to take matters into their own hands: an eastbound crossing on 6 September 1974, her 202nd crossing, was delayed several hours while the crew met to decide on strike action. Rather than strike immediately in New York, it was decided to strike six days later outside Le Havre. The ship was commandeered by a group of French trade unionists who anchored France in the entrance to the port, blocking all incoming and outgoing traffic. The 1,200 passengers aboard had to be ferried to shore on tenders, while approximately 800 of the crew remained aboard. The strikers demanded that the ship be allowed to continue to serve, along with a 35% wage increase for themselves. Their mission failed, and the night of the takeover proved to be the ship's last day of service for the CGT. It took over a month for the stand-off to end, and by 7 December 1974, the ship was moored at a distant quay in Le Havre, known colloquially as quai de l'oubli – the pier of oblivion.

By that time France had completed 377 crossings and 93 cruises (including two world cruises), carried a total of 588,024 passengers on trans-Atlantic crossings, and 113,862 passengers on cruises, and had sailed a total of 1,860,000 nautical miles.

=== First decommissioning ===
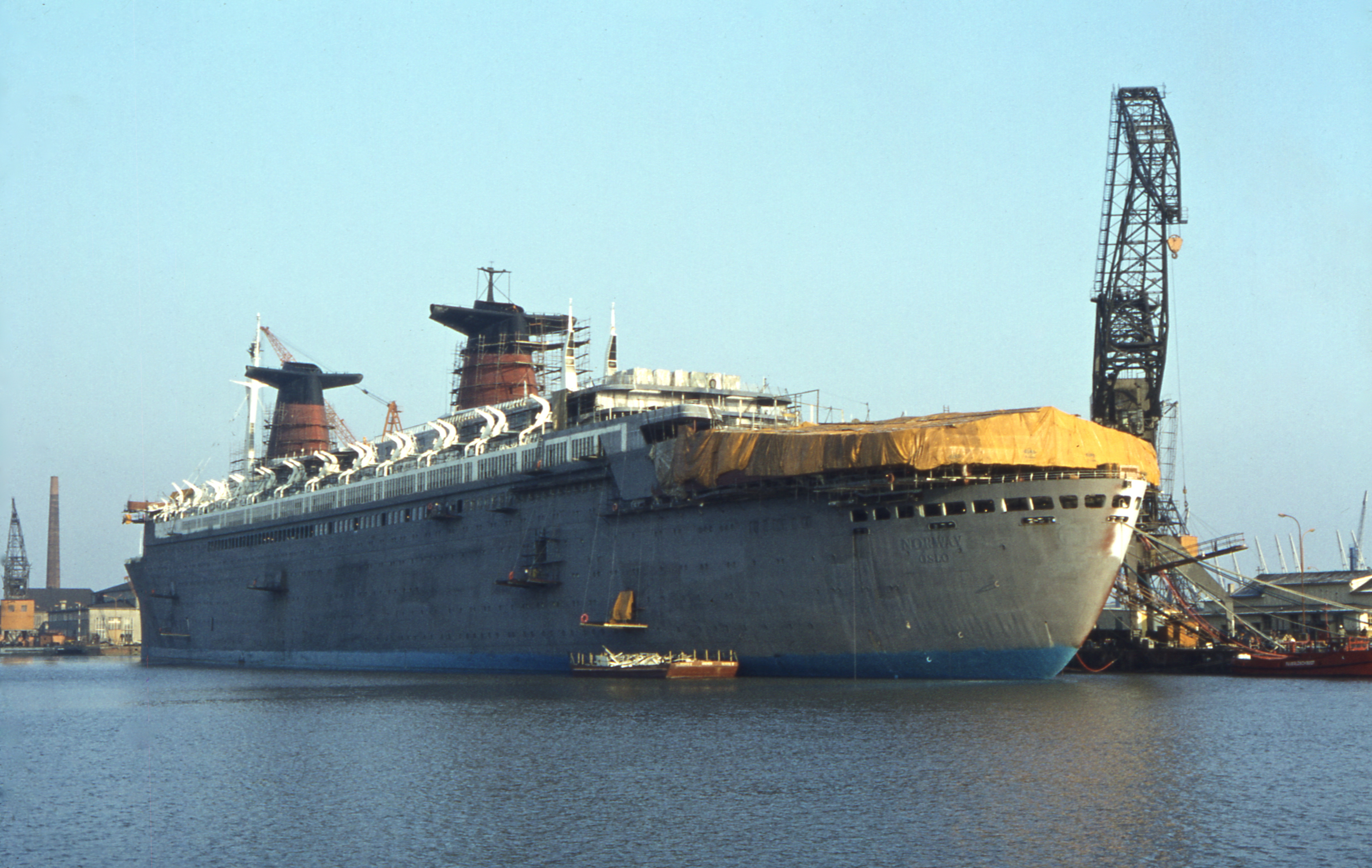
France being converted into Norway in Bremerhaven, January 1980.

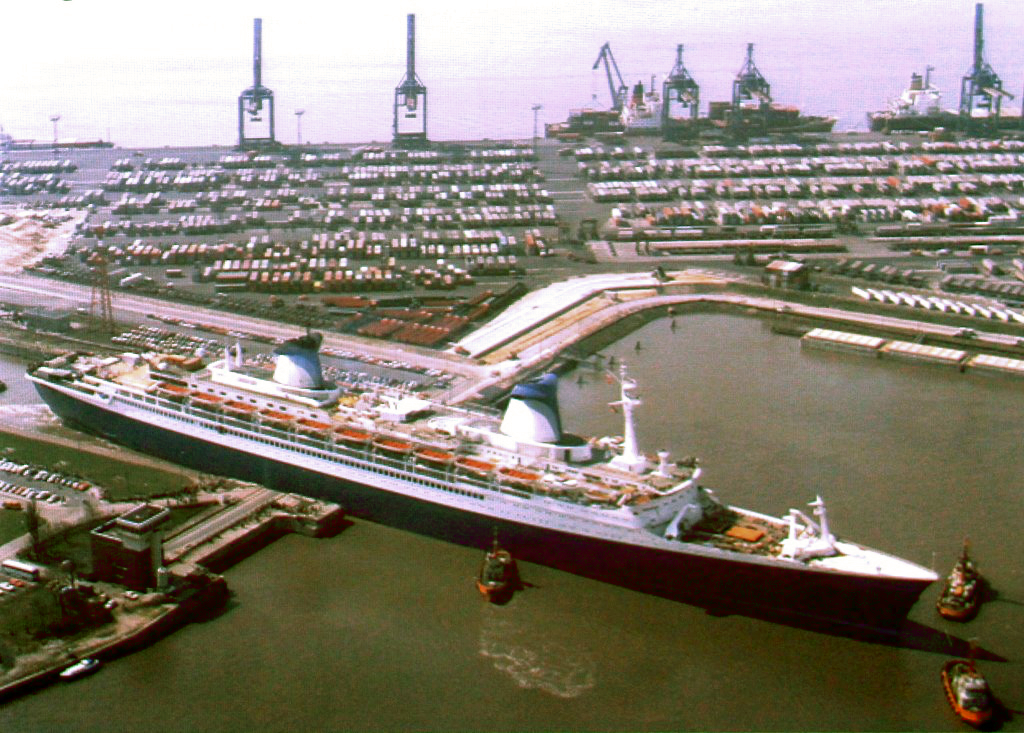
Norway leaving Lloyd shipyards in Bremerhaven after conversion.

The mothballing of France was met with dismay by much of the French population, resulting in a song by Michel Sardou, titled "Le France". The chorus of the song being "Never call me "France" again / France has let me down" ("Ne m'appelez plus jamais "France"/ La France elle m'a laissé tomber"). The French Communist Party and the trade unions of Le Havre approved the song, which also became an anthem for the defender of the ship.

The ship sat in the same spot for approximately four years, with the interiors, including all furniture, still completely intact. There were no plans to scrap the ship, or to sell it. In 1977 Saudi Arabian millionaire Akram Ojjeh expressed an interest in purchasing the vessel for use as a floating museum for antique French furniture and artworks, as well as a casino and hotel off the coast of the south-east United States. Though he purchased the ship for $24 million, this proposal was never realised, and others were rumoured to have floated, including bids from the Soviet Union to use her as a hotel ship in the Black Sea, and a proposal from China to turn her into a floating industrial trade fair.

In the end, the ship was sold in 1979 to Knut Kloster, the owner of Norwegian Caribbean Line for $18 million for conversion into the world's largest cruise ship. Hundreds of weddings had been celebrated on France over her transatlantic career; just before she was renamed Norway, one last marriage was performed aboard the ship at the quay in Le Havre. Norway was considered the first "mega" cruise ship.

By August of that year Norway was moved to the Lloyd shipyards in Bremerhaven, Germany, where she underwent renovations at a cost of US$80 million.

=== Service history as Norway ===
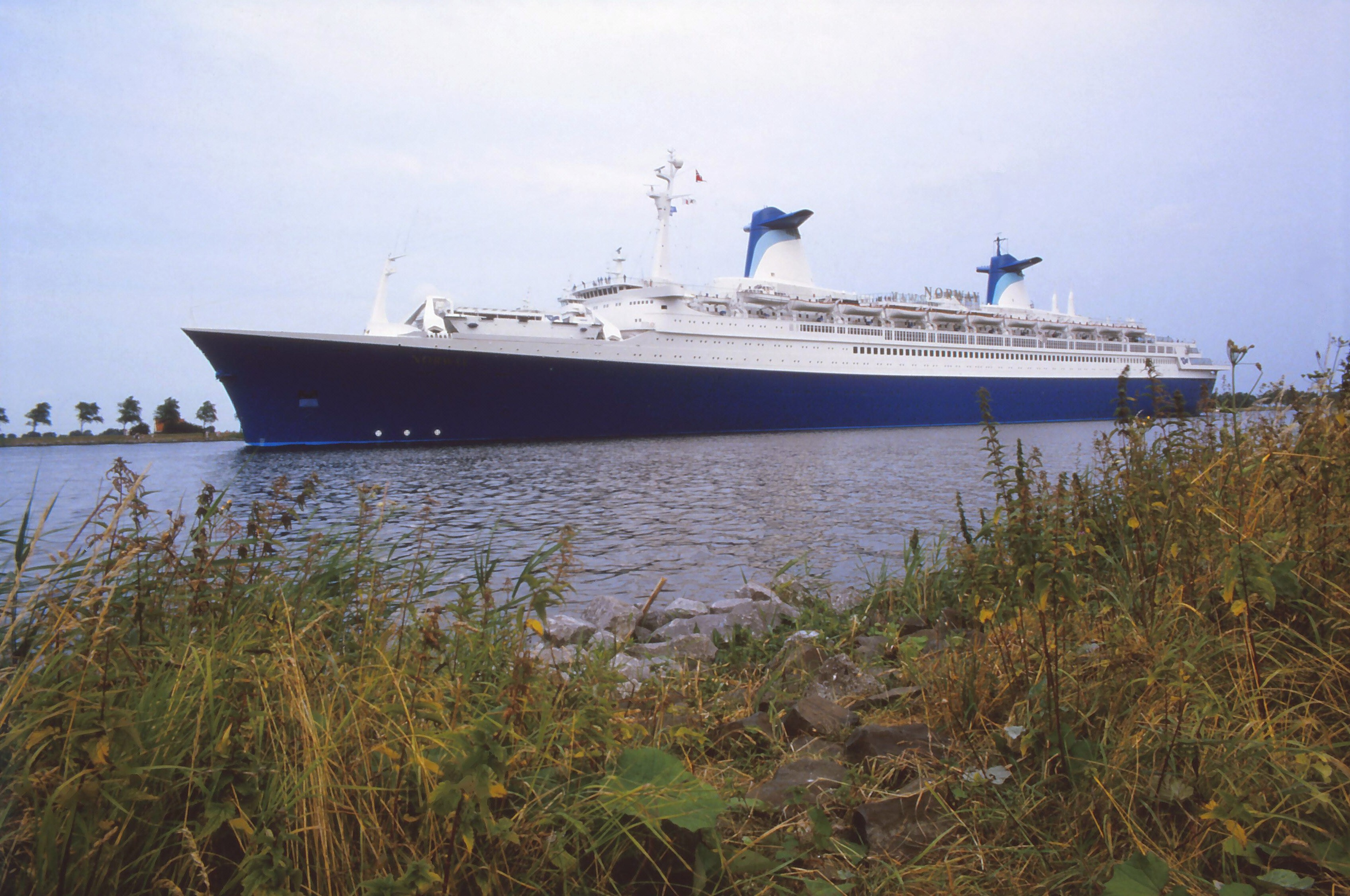
Norway at Velsen, Netherlands

Norway was registered in Oslo, given the call sign LITA (literally meaning "small"), and was re-christened on 14 April 1980. She was the only purpose-built transatlantic ocean liner that was remodeled to be employed exclusively in luxury cruise service. Her hull form, bow design, and accommodation layout had been designed specifically for the rigors of crossing the North Atlantic, year-round. In her remodeling for cruise service, she was given more passenger capacity, and larger and more numerous public spaces for cruise-type recreations. Mechanically, the four screw propulsion plant was reduced to two screws. And in a bid for economy she was given a complete set of bow/stern thrusters to give her the flexibility she needed to bring her into harbour and to dock without resorting to the expensive tugboat operations that were standard procedure in the heyday of the transatlantic express liners. When her refit was completed, and on her maiden call to Oslo, Senior Steward Wesley Samuels of Jamaica, in the presence of King Olav V, hoisted the United Nations flag as a sign of the ship's international crew.

She began her maiden voyage to Miami that same year, amidst speculation about her future in the cruise industry. France had been built as an ocean liner: for speed; long, narrow, with a deep draft, as well as an array of cabin shapes and sizes designed in a compact manner more suitable for fast intercontinental travel than relaxed cruising. But Norway proved popular, and made the notion of the ship being a destination in itself credible. Her size, passenger capacity, and amenities revolutionized the cruise industry and started a building frenzy as competitors began to order larger ships.

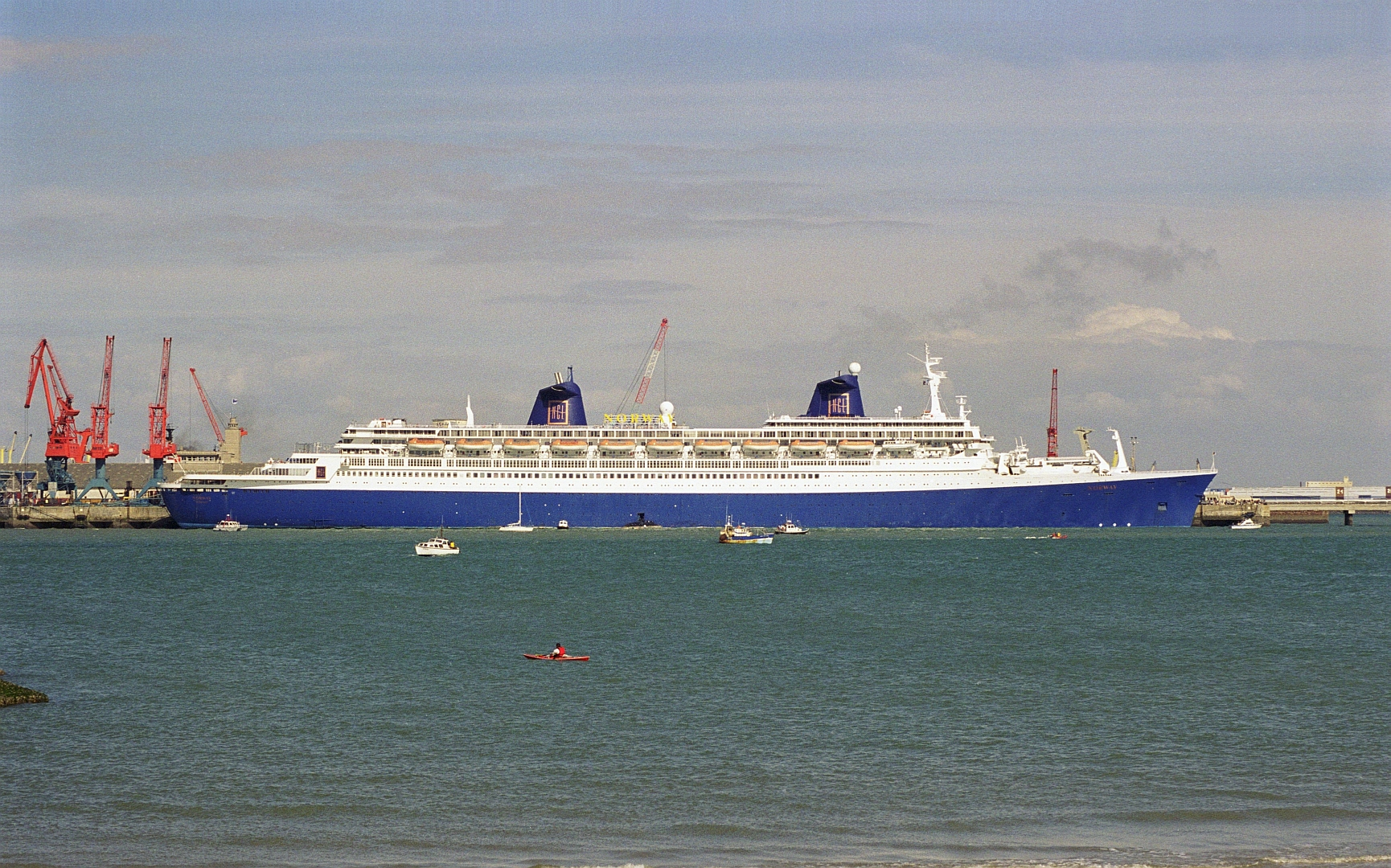
Side view of Norway in La Rochelle, France, July 1998

As cruise competition attempted to take some of Norway's brisk business, Norway herself was upgraded several times in order to maintain her position as the "grande dame" of the Caribbean. In September and October 1990, two decks were added atop her superstructure, adding 135 new suites and luxury cabins. While many ship aficionados consider that the new decks spoiled her original clean, classic lines, the new private veranda cabins on the added decks were instrumental in keeping Norway financially viable during the later years of her operation; they became a common feature throughout the cruise industry. She received additional refits in 1993 and 1996 in order to comply with new SOLAS (Safety of Life at Sea) regulations.

Competition eventually overtook Norway, even by newly built ships in NCL's lineup itself. No longer the "Ship amongst Ships", NCL severely cut back on her maintenance and upkeep. She experienced several mechanical breakdowns, fires, incidents of illegal waste dumping, and safety violations for which she was detained at port pending repairs. Despite the cutbacks, the ship remained extremely popular among cruise enthusiasts, some of whom questioned the owner's actions in light of the continuing successful operation of Queen Elizabeth 2, which had become a well-maintained rival still operating 5-star luxury cruises and transatlantic crossings for Cunard. In spite of this, the cutbacks continued and problems mounted even as the ship continued to sail with full occupancy. A turbocharger fire erupted on Norway as she entered Barcelona in 1999, which took her out of service for three weeks. During one of the following cruises to Norway she broke down in Bergen with leaks to one of the propeller seals delaying sailing until repaired.

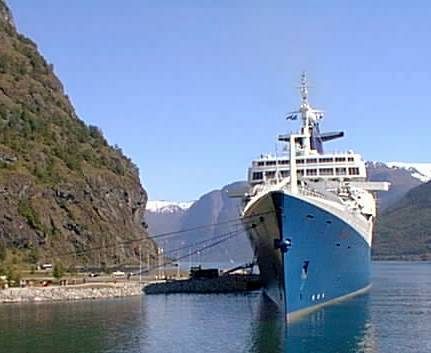
Norway in Flåm, Norway, 1999

Destined for retirement, Norway sailed out of Manhattan's west side piers for the last time on 5 September 2001, on yet another transatlantic crossing to Greenock, Scotland, and then on to her home port of Le Havre. Her passengers learnt of the terrorist attacks on New York and Washington six days later, while in mid-ocean. As the cruise industry reeled from the aftermath of the terrorist attacks, the ship's owners decided to place her back into service, operating bargain-basement cruises from Miami, after a brief cosmetic refit that failed to address her mounting mechanical and infrastructure problems.

==== 2003 explosion ====
On 25 May 2003, after docking in Miami at 5:00 a.m., Norway was seriously damaged by a boiler explosion at 6:37 a.m. that killed eight crew members and injured seventeen as superheated steam flooded the boiler room and blasted into crew quarters above through ruptured decking. No passengers were injured. The National Transportation Safety Board determined that "the probable cause of the boiler rupture on the Norway was the deficient boiler operation, maintenance, and inspection practices". On 27 June 2003, NCL/Star decided to relocate Norway, and she departed Miami under tow, although at first NCL/Star refused to announce her destination. She headed towards Europe and eventually arrived in Bremerhaven on 23 September 2003. NCL announced that constructing a new boiler was not possible but boiler parts were available to make the needed repairs. In Bremerhaven she was used as accommodation for NCL crew training to take their places on the line's new Pride of America.

==== Former itineraries as Norway ====
NCL originally planned for Norway to sail empty from Germany to Miami, but a pre-inaugural cruise was added, with only a limited number of passengers allowed to sail. Starting from Oslo, Norway, stopping at Southampton, England, and ending in New York City. A 6-day cruise to Bermuda was planned but cancelled at the last minute in favor of fixing some problems. She set sail on her first inaugural cruise from Miami, Florida, on 1 June 1980, a 7-day cruise with only two stops, one in Little San Salvador then followed by a stop in St. Thomas, USVI. The other days of the cruise were sea days as Norway was the destination itself. This remained her main itinerary from 1980 to 1982 until NCL announced Nassau, Bahamas was added. By 1985 St. Maarten, Netherlands Antilles was added. In 1987 her new itinerary was introduced: a 7-day cruise from Miami stopping at St. Maarten, St. John, USVI; St. Thomas and Great Stirrup Cay. Her Western Caribbean cruises later introduced were 7-days stopping at Cozumel, Mexico; Grand Cayman, Cayman Islands; Roatan and NCL's private island Great Stirrup Cay. Between regular cruising in the Caribbean and dry dock periods, she sailed many cruises to Western Mediterranean, Western Europe coast, Northern Europe, the British Isles and the Norwegian fjords.

Her official farewell cruise was a 17-day transatlantic cruise from Miami stopping at New York; Halifax, Nova Scotia; St. John's, Newfoundland and Labrador; Greenock, Scotland; Le Havre, and ending in Southampton. But a decision was made to keep Norway sailing bargain-priced Caribbean cruises out of Miami. This continued until her withdrawal in May 2003.

=== Second decommissioning ===
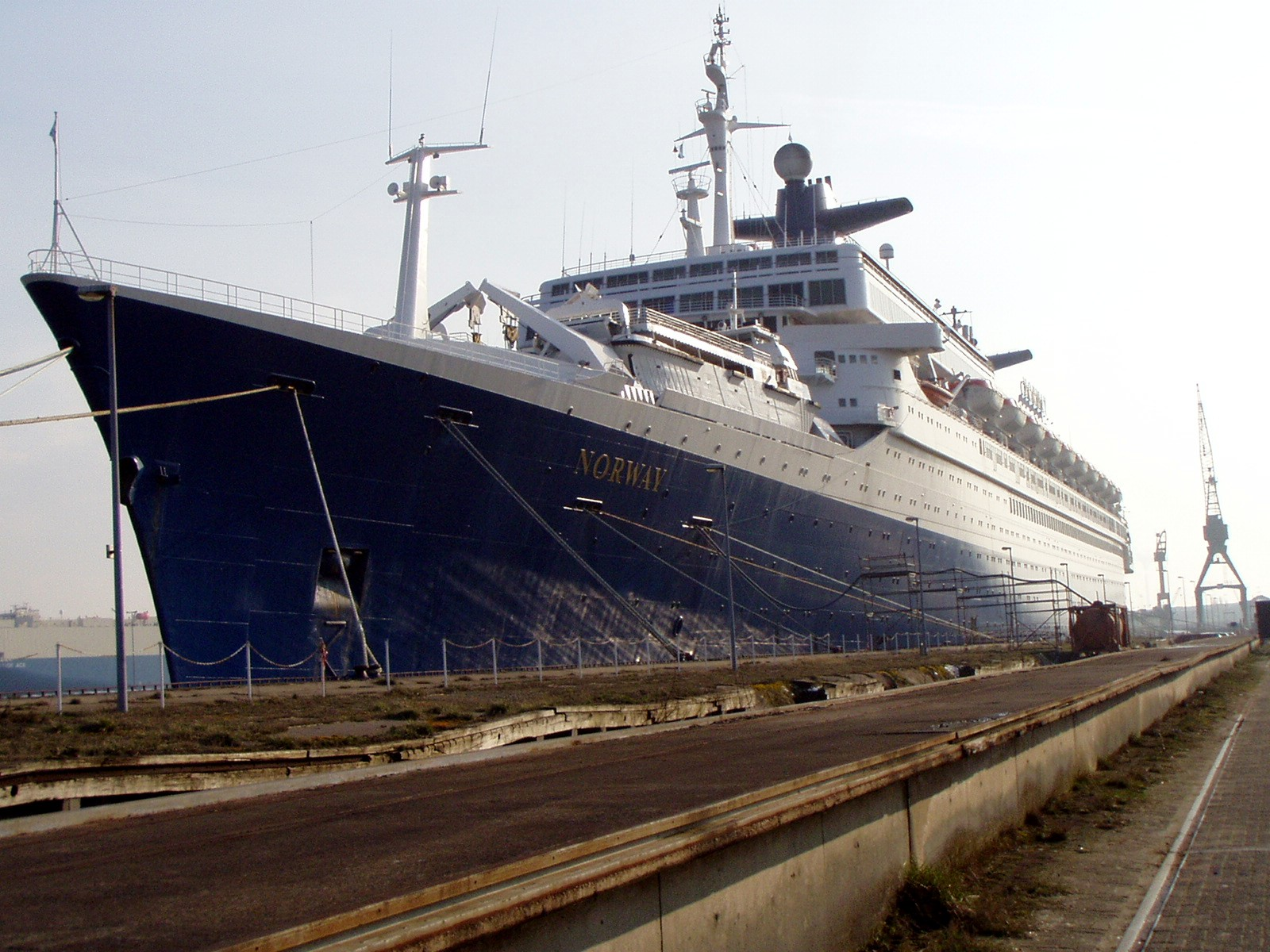
Norway moored in Bremerhaven, Germany, February 2004

NCL Chief Executive Colin Veitch announced on 23 March 2004 "Norway will never sail again". The ship's ownership was transferred to NCL's parent company, Star Cruises. Due to large amounts of asbestos aboard the ship, mostly in machine and bulkhead areas, Norway was not allowed to leave Germany for any scrapyards due to the Basel Convention. After assuring the German authorities that Norway would go to Asia for repairs and further operation in Australia, she was allowed to leave port under tow. Norway left Bremerhaven under tow on 23 May 2005, and reached Port Klang, Malaysia on 10 August 2005.

In fact, the ship was sold to an American naval demolition dealer for scrap value in December 2005. After eventually reselling the ship to a scrap yard, the ship was to be towed to India for demolition. In light of protests from Greenpeace, potentially lengthy legal battles due to environmental concerns over the ship's breakup, and amidst charges of fraudulent declarations made by the company to obtain permission to leave Bremerhaven, her owners cancelled the sale contract, refunded the purchase price, and left the ship where she was.

=== Blue Lady ===
Norway was sold in April 2006 to Bridgend Shipping Limited of Monrovia, Liberia, and renamed Blue Lady in preparation for scrapping. One month later she was again sold, to Haryana Ship Demolition Pvt. Ltd., and was subsequently left anchored in waters off the Malaysian coast after the government of Bangladesh refused Blue Lady entry into their waters due to the onboard asbestos. Three weeks later the ship began her journey, sailing to the United Arab Emirates for repairs and to take on new crew and supplies before continuing to Indian waters.

Upon learning of the ship's destination, Gopal Krishna, an environmentalist and an anti-asbestos activist, filed an application before the Supreme Court of India to ensure that the ship, containing asbestos, complied with the Court's 14 October 2003 order which sought prior decontamination of ships in the country of export before they could be allowed entry into Indian waters. On 17 May 2006, Kalraj Mishra expressed his concern to the Indian Parliament over possible hazards Blue Lady presented, and requested that the government put a halt to the ship's entry. As the Indian Supreme Court had lifted any ban on the ship's entry, Blue Lady had come from Fujairah, UAE, and was anchored 100 km off the Indian coast in mid-July.

This also cleared the way for her scrapping at Alang, in Gujarat, pending an inspection of the on-board asbestos by experts from the Gujarat Pollution Control Board (GPCB). After GPCB chairman, K.Z. Bhanujan, said the Board had constituted an experts' committee for inspection, Blue Lady was docked in Pipavav, Amreli district. On 2 August 2006, after a five-day inspection, the experts declared the ship safe for beaching and dismantling in Alang. This prompted a fury of controversy over the legality of such an act, including a press release from the NGO Platform on Shipbreaking that critiqued the technical report, alleging that the Technical Committee was under undue pressure to allow the ship to be beached, and had failed to follow the Basel Convention and the Supreme Court of India's order that ships must be decontaminated of hazardous substances such as PCBs and asbestos, and, in any case, must be fully inventoried and formally notified prior to arrival in the importing country. No such notification had been made by either Malaysia (last country of departure) nor Germany (country where the ship became waste).

The Platform on Shipbreaking also announced that it was prepared to launch a global campaign against Star Cruises and their subsidiary Norwegian Cruise Lines for corporate negligence in this case.

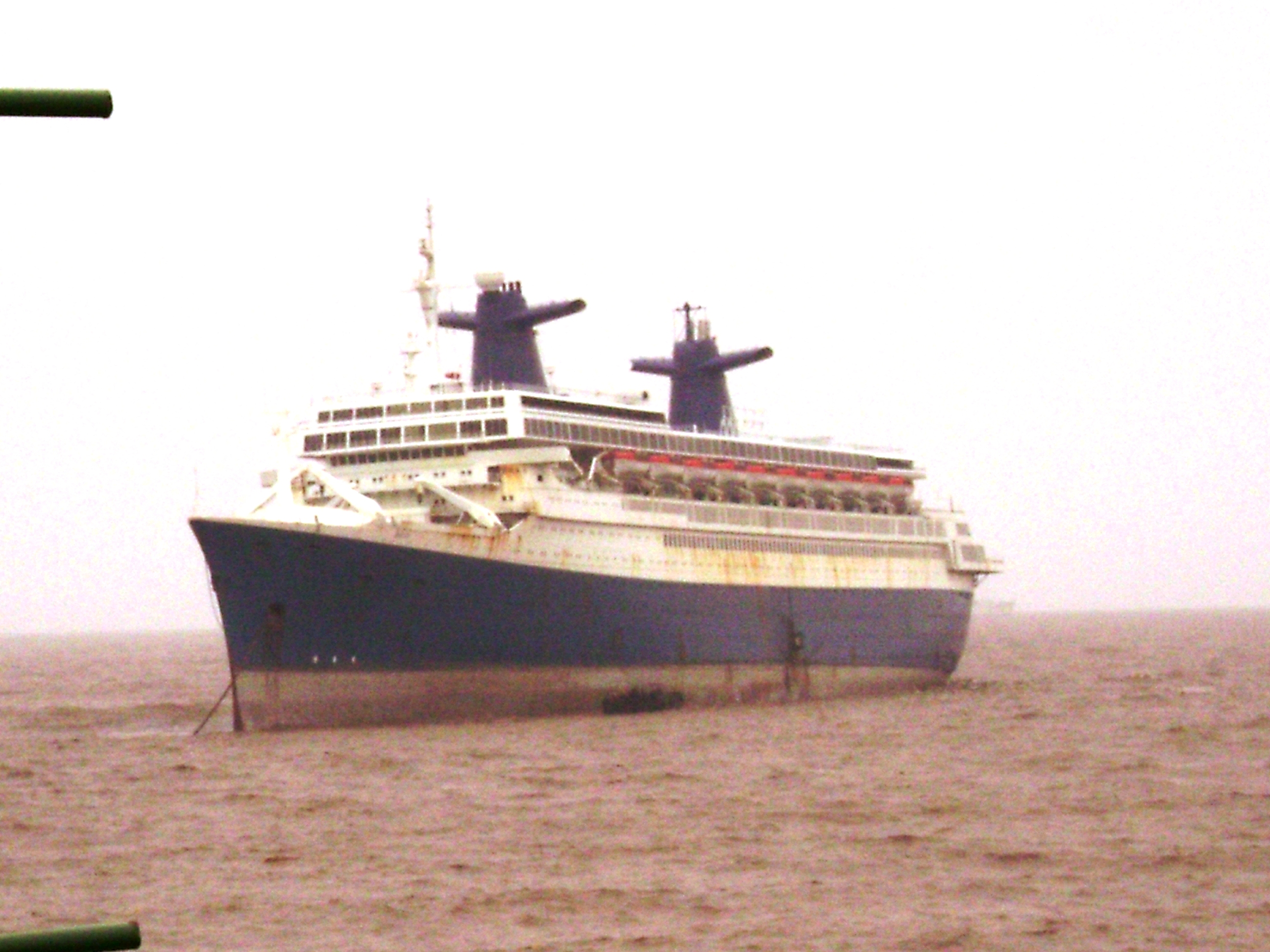
Blue Lady at Alang, India, awaiting scrapping.

Photos from Alang revealed that Blue Lady was still partially afloat off the coast; her bow on dry beach at low tide, and the ship fully afloat at high tide. The photos also showed that neither NCL nor Star Cruises had removed any of the ship's onboard furniture or artworks as had been reported.

Fans of France became concerned about the future of the art pieces, both due to the ship lying at anchor in a very humid environment without power for air conditioning, and due to lack of concern for preservation on the part of the scrappers. It was stated that as of early September 2006 the ship's owner had signed contracts with various buyers, including auctioneers and a French museum, to sell the artworks. Other fittings were to be sold by the ton.

Gopal Krishna again moved an application seeking compliance with the Basel Convention, and three days later the Indian Supreme Court decided that the scrapping was to be postponed, stipulating that the Technical Committee, which earlier approved the scrapping, was to write a new report to be submitted before the Court's final decision. That decision was reached on 11 September 2007, the 33rd anniversary of France's last day on the Atlantic, when the court ruled that Blue Lady was safe to scrap, a decision that was objected to by environmentalists.

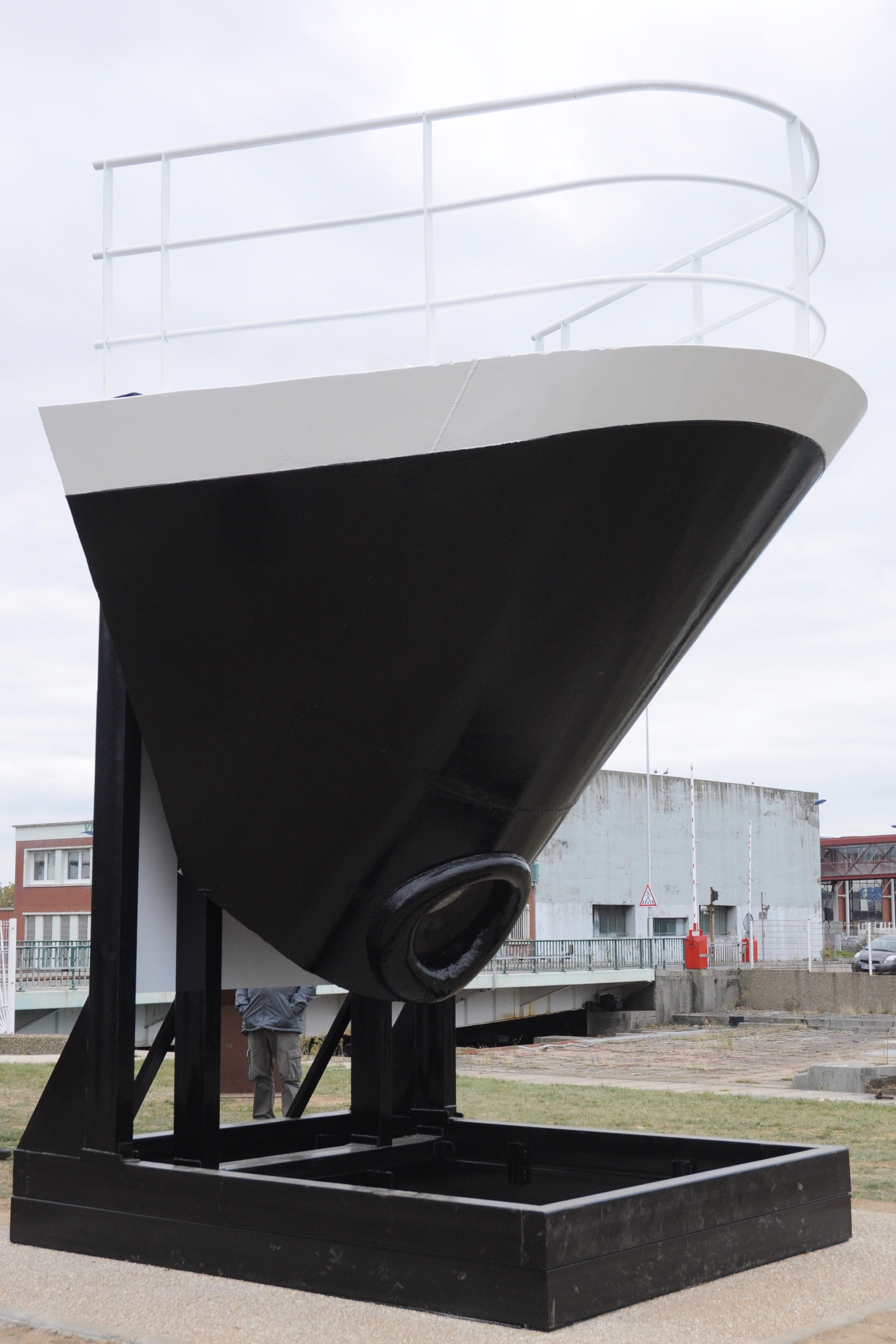
The bow on display in Le Havre, 2018

By 4 December of the same year, it was confirmed that the tip of Blue Lady's bow had been cut, a ceremonial move done to most ships that end up in Alang just before their full-scale breaking. It was confirmed on 20 January that Blue Lady had commenced scrapping. Scrapping began on the forward part of the sun deck. The suites added during the 1990 refit were gone by March, briefly returning the ship to her pre-1990 profile.

By 12 July 2008 the bow and the stern of the ship had been removed, with little of the ship's famous profile still recognizable. By September 2008, most of what remained above the waterline had been cut away, and the ship's demolition was essentially completed by late 2008.

In 2009 the tip of the bow of Blue Lady was returned to the country of her birth as one of a catalogue of auction pieces removed from the ship before scrapping commenced. The auction was held on 8 and 9 February. Initially put on public display at Paris Yacht Marina, Port de Grenelle, Paris 15e, in 2018 the tip was acquired by the city of Le Havre and put on display near the fishing port.

In January 2010 one of the two sets of neon letters which sat atop the superstructure of France before her conversion was restored and put on display. The letters, which spell "France", were displayed at the Musée national de la Marine in Paris. After this they were returned to Le Havre and presented to the Musée Malraux, and now face the front of the harbor.

== Design ==
=== Exterior ===
==== France ====
When France was commissioned in 1956 the French Line asked for a ship which was to be the longest ever built, as well as one of the fastest. But beyond the technicalities, the ship was also to be an ocean-going symbol of France and thus had to be artfully designed. Her 316-meter (1,035 ft) hull was designed with a traditional tumble-home, but with a flared stem line at the bow, which ended in a bulbous bow beneath the waterline, evoking similar lines on Normandie. Also similar to Normandie, France was equipped with a whaleback on her bow.

Deckhouses on France's superstructure were built of aluminium, to reduce the ship's weight and thereby conserve fuel in operation. Within the superstructure a full-length outdoor promenade deck was designed into both sides of the Pont Canots. Unlike on many other ships, this deck did not wrap completely around the ship, being blocked at the forward end by cabins built in behind the bridgescreen.

One of France's most distinguishable features were her funnels, designed not only to be eye-catching but functional as well. They were constructed with wings on each side to carry exhaust fumes outwards into the ship's slipstream, where they would be caught by the wind and carried away from the passenger decks below. In addition, each stack had a device that filtered solids from the outlet, returned it into the depths of the ship and then disposed of it into the ocean. Despite the modern appearance of France, she was painted in the traditional CGT colours, used since the 19th century, of a black hull with red boot-topping and white superstructure, and funnels in red with black cap-bands.

The ship's exterior remained unchanged during her thirteen years of service.

==== Norway ====
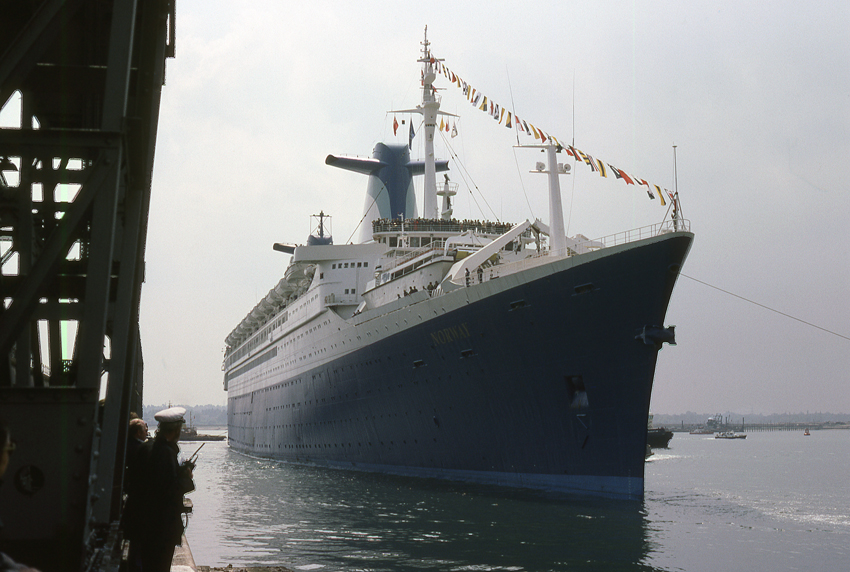
Norway arriving at Southampton on maiden voyage

In the conversion of France into a cruise ship, many alterations were made to her exterior decks.

Most notably, vast areas of deck space were opened up, and extended at the stern. A large lido deck was created at the very aft, built so wide, to accommodate as many sunbathing passengers as possible, that it cantilevered over the hull below, which narrowed in towards the stern at that point. The terrace off the First Class Smoking Room was lost in the construction of an outdoor buffet restaurant, and the Patio Provençal on the Sun Deck was filled in with a top-side swimming pool. This last addition created an odd space on Norway, where a tunnel-like space remained around the tank of the pool, into which the original exterior windows and doors of the surrounding cabins, which once looked into the Patio Provençal, still opened, all in their original 1960s colours.

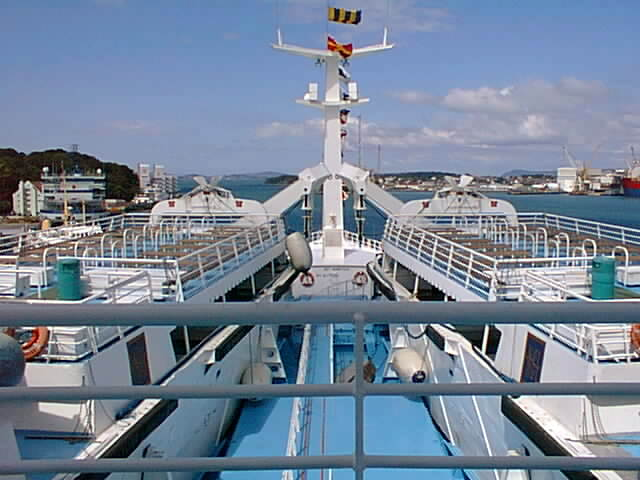
Tenders Little Norway I and Little Norway II

On the forecastle, behind the whaleback, the two cargo kingposts were removed and giant davits were installed to hoist two two-deck, 11-knot tenders, built by Holen Mekaniske Verksted in Norway, used to transfer passengers between Norway and island docks where the harbour would not accommodate the ship's 9-meter (35 ft) draft. Based on a World War II landing craft design, these tenders were named Little Norway I and Little Norway II, and were each themselves registered as ships, making Norway the only passenger ship in the world to carry ships. The two tenders were removed after the ship's retirement and moved to Norwegian's private island at Great Stirrup Cay in the Bahamas; they remained in service as of 2015.

Below the waterline, the forward engine room was dismantled and the two outboard propellers were removed to reduce fuel consumption, as a cruise ship did not need a high service speed.

Her operation was revived three further times, in 1990, 1997, and 2001, after machinery, decks, and recreational facilities were renovated. During her 1990 refit, two further decks were added to the top of her structure, with luxury suites with private verandas. This addition raised her overall tonnage to 76,049 (reclaiming the title of largest passenger ship in the world, from the 73,000-ton Sovereign of the Seas), her passenger capacity to 2,565, and gave her a competitive edge against newer ships being built at that time which had more and more private balcony suites for their passengers. The addition of the decks was criticised by ship fans for making Norway appear top-heavy.

=== Interior ===
==== France ====
France's interiors were where the ship displayed its purpose as a showcase of modern French art and design. However, the interior designers were burdened with the pressure of living up to France's last great Ship of State, Normandie, whose interiors had been on a scale never surpassed either before or since her construction. On top of this they had to work within the more strict fire regulations laid down after the end of World War II, which gave them a limited palette consisting of few woods and much aluminium, Formica, and plastic veneers. This was very much like the interiors of SS United States, put into service nearly ten years before, and inspired the design of the public rooms on Queen Elizabeth 2 eight years later. Also, fire regulations would not allow France to have the grand vistas that were constructed through Normandie's main First Class rooms. France's only double-height spaces were the theatre, First Class smoking room, and both first and tourist Class dining rooms.

One area given an unusual amount of attention was the ship's kitchens; 1,500 square meters in area, and placed almost amidships, between the two dining rooms which the one kitchen served. It was thought by the CGT directors that France would not only display the best in French art and design, but also cuisine. The kitchens were equipped with the most advanced machinery available, as well as many traditional cooking aids, including a stove that was 12 meters long and 2.5 meters wide. Staffed with 180 of France's best cooks, sauce and pastry chefs, rotisserie cooks, head waiters and wine stewards, this team made France one of the finest restaurants in the world, and the food on board prompted food critic Craig Claiborne to state France's Grille Room was the "best French restaurant in the world."

France's dog kennels were located on the Sun Deck, and, as they served both European and American dogs, the run was installed with both a Parisian milestone and a New York City fire hydrant.

For First Class passengers, the Pont Veranda (Veranda Deck) held most of the public rooms. These included the Library and Reading Room, Smoking Room, Grand Salon, and balcony of the theatre, which was dedicated to First Class passengers only. These rooms were arranged down the centre of the ship, with large, glass-enclosed promenades to either side. The Library was a circular room with glass and lacquered aluminium enclosed book-cases all around, holding 2,200 editions, and was overseen by an attendant who regulated the borrowing and returning of books, as well as assisting passengers with their choices. The Grand Salon had a raised ceiling in the centre, over the abstract grey and white marble mosaic dance floor, with lower more intimate spaces at the corners. The theatre, which functioned both as a proscenium (live theatre) and cinema, sat 185 in the balcony, 479 on the orchestra level, and had a projection booth which could handle 16, 35, and 70 mm film. Until the 1990s it was the largest theatre ever constructed on a ship. However, one of the main showpieces of the First Class salons was the Smoking Room at the very aft of the Pont Veranda. It had a raised section in the centre flanked by columns and double-height windows to port and starboard.

One level down was Pont Promenade, the main Tourist Class deck. The main lounges and rooms here were the Library, Smoking Room, Grand Salon, and orchestra level of the theatre. Like the Pont Veranda, Pont Promenade also had a glass-enclosed promenade along the port and starboard sides of the ship, though the windows did not run full height, nor were the spaces as long.

Pont A held both First Class and Tourist Class dining rooms. These rooms served as the gastronomic counterparts to the smoking rooms, in terms of importance, and thus of form and décor. The First Class Dining Room was located amidships, and spanned the full width of the ship, accommodating 400 passengers. The centre of the space rose to a circular dome, some 5.5 m (18 ft) high and, as on Normandie, passengers entered from one deck up (Pont Principale) and descended a grand, central staircase to the main dining room floor. Glassware, 4,800 wine and water glasses, was provided by Saint-Louis crystal factory, and tableware consisted of 22,000 china items, with 25,500 pieces of silverware. The Tourist Class Dining Room similarly was two decks high, but differed in that it had dining on the upper level, with only a well between the two floors, and no connecting staircase. It was placed aft of the kitchens, and sat 826 people. Next to the upper level of this dining room was the Children's Dining Room, which allowed both First and Second class parents to dine without the "inconvenience" of young children.

After the first few of France's cruises, CGT executives realised that there was a problem regarding the naming of the public rooms. After her entrance into service, the rooms were simply known as the "First Class Grand Salon," "First Class Dining Room," "Tourist Class Library," etc. However, during a cruise, where class barriers were withdrawn and all passengers were allowed to use all the spaces equally, it became a slight embarrassment for a passenger travelling in a large cabin to ask a steward for directions to the Tourist Class Dining Room. Hence, proper names were applied to each room to avoid the issue:

- First Class Salon – Salon Fontainebleau
- First Class Music Room – Salon Debussy
- First Class Card Room – Salon Monaco
- First Class Smoking Room – Salon Riviera
- First Class Dining Room – Salle à Manger Chambord
- Tourist Class Salon – Salon Saint Tropez
- Tourist Class Music Room – Salon Ravel
- Tourist Class Smoking Room – Cafe Rive Gauche
- Tourist Class Dining Room – Salle à Manger Versailles

Some facilities were open to both classes: Bar de l'Atlantique, essentially an after-hours club for drinking and dancing late into the night, the Tourist children's playroom, and the chapel, also open to both classes, all of which were located on First Class Pont Veranda.

===== Art =====
The décor of the rooms was regarded itself as art, with many notable French designers and artists commissioned to create the most striking spaces at sea. Beyond this, many artworks were especially ordered to adorn the walls of the dining rooms, lounges and cabins. Within the Salon Riviera a 17.4 m (57 ft) long tapestry by Jean Picart le Doux dominated the entire forward wall. In the same room two paintings by Roger Chapelain-Midy occupied niches in opposite corners to the aft. The overall interior was designed by André Arbus, who had previously worked with Chapelain-Midy to design sets for a performance of Les Indes galantes at the Palais Garnier in 1952. Slightly forward, the Salon Fontainebleau was decorated by Maxime Old, and contained three tapestries by Lucien Coutaud (Les femmes fleurs), two by Claude Idoux (Jardin magique, Fée Mirabelle) and Camille Hilaire (Sous-bois, Forêt de France). Near that room was the Salon Debussy (Music Room) with three bronze lacquered panels by Pierre Bobot, and a bronze abstract sculpture of a young woman playing a flute, by Hubert Yencesse. The theatre's interior was done in red, grey and gold by Peynet, with the ceiling in grey mosaic tile, and the port and starboard walls in vertical gold lacquered aluminium panels, tilted outwards to allow recessed lighting from behind. The chapel's interior was created by Anne Carlu Subes (daughter of Jacques Carlu) in silver anodized aluminium panels arranged in a 45-degree grid pattern. Jacques Noël created trompe-l'œil panels for all four walls of the First Class Children's Playroom in a Renaissance theme, and Jean A. Mercier painted a full mural entitled Une nouvelle arche de Noé (A New Noah's Ark) for the Tourist Class Children's Playroom, using an abstract rendition of France as the Ark. The Bar de l'Atlantique contained two ceramics by Pablo Picasso and three other ceramic sculptures, Faune cavalier, Portrait de Jacqueline and Joueur de flûte et danseuse, by the artist in the Salon Saint-Tropez.

Lower down the dining rooms were fitted out with the intention that the rooms would be visual equivalents of the excellent food served within them. The Chambord dining room was decorated by Mrs. Darbois-Gaudin in gold anodized aluminium, with monochrome chairs in red, orange and cream. The dome, painted black, contained an array of recessed spot-lights, and sat within a circular band of translucent, fluorescent-lit panels, all on a truncated rotunda of gold aluminium. Around all four walls of the room Jean Mandaroux's continuous mural, painted on 17 lacquered aluminium sheets, was entitled Les plaisirs de la vie: The Pleasures of Life. Less sumptuous in design, the Versailles dining room was done by Marc Simon in tones of green, white and grey. The walls were produced from Polyrey and Formica with a decoupaged gold leaf abstract pattern. Only the forward wall held a mural done in 14 engraved glass panels by Max Ingrand, as well as two tapestries, Les amoureux du printemps by Marc Saint-Saëns, and Paysage provençal by Auvigné. Lowest in the ship, the walls of the First Class swimming pool were covered with back-lit engraved glass panels by Max Ingrand, and a ceramic sculptural fountain by Jean Mayodon sat at the forward end of the room.

The First Class cabins also displayed design and art, especially in the Appartements de Grand Luxe. There were two aboard France, amidships, on the port and starboard sides, on Pont Supérieur. Each had a salon, dining room, two bedrooms, and three bathrooms. The Appartement de Grand Luxe Île de France held a painting, La place de la Concorde, by Bernard Lamotte, as well as Parc de Versailles by Jean Carzou, who also designed the suite's main salon. Slightly less expensive were the Appartements de Luxe, of which there were 12, such as the Appartement de Luxe Flandres with a painting by Jean Dries. Each of these was decorated by artists, including the bathrooms where mosaic artwork adorned the walls around tubs and showers. Some of the mosaics were by the sculptor Jacques Zwobada.

==== Norway ====
After the ship was purchased by Kloster in 1979 many of the original 1960s interiors were lost as rooms were either demolished within larger renovations, or redecorated to suit Caribbean cruising, under the direction of maritime architect Tage Wandborg and New York interior designer Angelo Donghia. Areas that were completely remodelled included all of the Tourist Class public rooms, and their indoor promenade areas were filled with prefabricated "junior suite" cabins. The former Versailles dining room, now the Leeward, saw the least remodelling, the wall finish and etched glass mural remaining; however, carpeting and furniture was replaced, the open well was lined with smoked glass and aluminium handrails, an aluminium chandelier was placed over the two-storey space, and a spiral staircase was installed to connect the two levels. The former Salon Saint Tropez became Norway's North Cape Lounge for cabaret and other shows; the décor more dark and muted. Further forward on the same deck, the old Café Rive Gauche was transformed into the ship's Monte Carlo casino. With the promenade windows now within cabins, no daylight penetrated to the casino, and so all windows were filled in. The Tourist Class swimming pool, its glass dome gone after the construction of the open pool deck above, was filled with neon lights and covered with a glass dance floor as part of the remodelling of the entire space into the ship's Dazzles disco.

However, most First Class rooms were left intact, save for the Salon Riviera and Salon Fontainebleau. The former was transformed into the Club International (dubbed Club-I by Norway aficionados), where every element of the original décor was removed. The square columns were made round with vertical aluminium fluting, the walls were repainted in a cream with baby-blue in the ceiling and wall niches, and all the original artwork and furniture was removed. In the corner niches oversized, crystal encrusted Neptune statues were placed, and similar crystal garlanded busts sat on brackets on the forward bulkhead. Lounge seating, sofas and rattan chairs were placed amongst potted ferns, giving the room an overall Miami art-deco feel. Only the railings and bronze, star-shaped light fixtures were original to the room. The latter space was gutted and remade into Checkers Cabaret; a small show lounge with abstract chrome palm trees around the columns, red lacquered wall panels, and a black-and-white checker board dance floor, again evoking a 1920s jazz club. The First Class Library remained untouched, and still used for the same purpose, while the Salon Debussy was turned into a shop, though its bronze décor and distinctive ceiling remained intact. To either side of these rooms ran the original First Class promenade decks, which were now turned into main circulation halls along the ship's principal public deck; the starboard dubbed Fifth Avenue and the port as Champs-Élysées, complete with columnar advertising posts similar to those found in Paris.

=== Main propulsion ===
France was constructed by the CGT with speed and comfort in mind, and used the most advanced technology of the time in the design of the ship's propulsion system and other power generating machinery. Fuel costs were also an added factor.

Her engines used eight high-pressure, super-heating boilers delivering 64 bars (930 psi) of pressure and 500 °C (932 °F), all weighing 8,000 tons. This delivered 175,000 horsepower (130,000 kW) and provided for a service speed of 30 knots (56 km/h; 35 mph) and a maximum speed of 35 knots (65 km/h; 40 mph), with a fuel consumption of 750 tonnes of oil per 24 hours. The machinery turning the four propellers was divided into two fore and aft groups, as was the electrical generating station.

When France was converted into Norway, the speed for trans-Atlantic crossing was no longer needed, and so the forward boilers and engines were shut down and eventually dismantled. This reduced fuel consumption to 250 tonnes per 24 hours. The remaining four boilers and engine room were made fully automated, and operated from either a central control station below decks, or from the bridge. Five bow and stern thrusters, developing 10,600 hp, were installed to provide manoeuvrability in ports without the assistance of tugs.

== Media appearances ==
France, as one of the last transatlantic ocean liners before the jet age, was also treated as the connection between, for example, New York and France. This was shown in the film Le Gendarme à New York where the main characters sail on France. The film also shows some of the 1960s interior of the ship.

The short Harold Baim documentary S.S. France, narrated by Nicholas Parsons, shows the interiors and operation of the ship in 1973.

France was the ship on which Elton John crossed the Atlantic Ocean in September 1974. He wrote the music to Bernie Taupin's lyrics for the Captain Fantastic And the Brown Dirt Cowboy album using the ship's piano.

In 1975, French singer Michel Sardou released a single "Le France" about the end of the ship, that was a huge hit in France and French-speaking countries.

In 1983, Anne Murray and guests, Richard Simmons, Eddie Rabbitt, and Luis Rodriguez performed musical numbers while aboard Norway for a TV show called Caribbean Cruise.

In 1994, the Norway, was featured in the children's show Real Wheels in the episode There Goes A Boat.

On 30 July 1998, at the request of a passenger, the pilots of Proteus Airlines Flight 706 made a slight detour from their intended route from Lyon to Lorient in Brittany, to see Norway, anchored in nearby Quiberon Bay. While circling the ship at a low altitude to give passengers a birds-eye view of the iconic former French vessel, the twin-engined Beechcraft 1900D was hit by a Cessna 177, causing both to crash into the bay and killing all 15 people aboard both aircraft. The event was chronicled in the Canadian TV series Mayday season 16, episode 5: "Deadly Detour".

In The Simpsons season 25 episode 12 "Diggs" originally broadcast on 9 March 2014, the episode's Couch Gag featured an animation by Sylvain Chomet. A picture of France replaced the picture of the boat.

France was also seen in the 2015 animated feature Minions. At timestamp 0:11:15, as the Minions leave the water in New York City in 1968, the France is seen in the background. Both the name and funnels are clearly visible.

== See also ==
- SS France (1910)
- SS Normandie
- SS Liberté
- SS United States
- SS Constitution
- SS Independence
- Pierre-Marie Poisson

== Bibliography ==
- Brinnin, John Malcolm (1971). The Sway of the Grand Saloon: a Social History of the North Atlantic. New York: Delacorte Press.
- Coleman, Terry (1977). The liners: a history of the North Atlantic crossing. Harmondsworth: Penguin Books.
- Fox, Robert (1999). Liners: The Golden Age. Die Grosse Zeit der Ozeanriesen. L'Âge d'or des paquebots. Cologne: Konneman.
- Maddocks, Melvin (1978). The Great Liners. Alexandria, VA: Time-Life Books.
- Maxtone-Graham, John (1972). The Only Way to Cross. New York: Collier Books.
- Maxtone-Graham, John (2010). France/Norway: France's Last Liner/Norway's First Mega Cruise Ship. New York: W. W. Norton & Co. ISBN 9780393069037.
- Miller, William H. (2009). SS France/Norway. Classic Liners series. Stroud, Gloucestershire: The History Press. ISBN 9780752451398.
