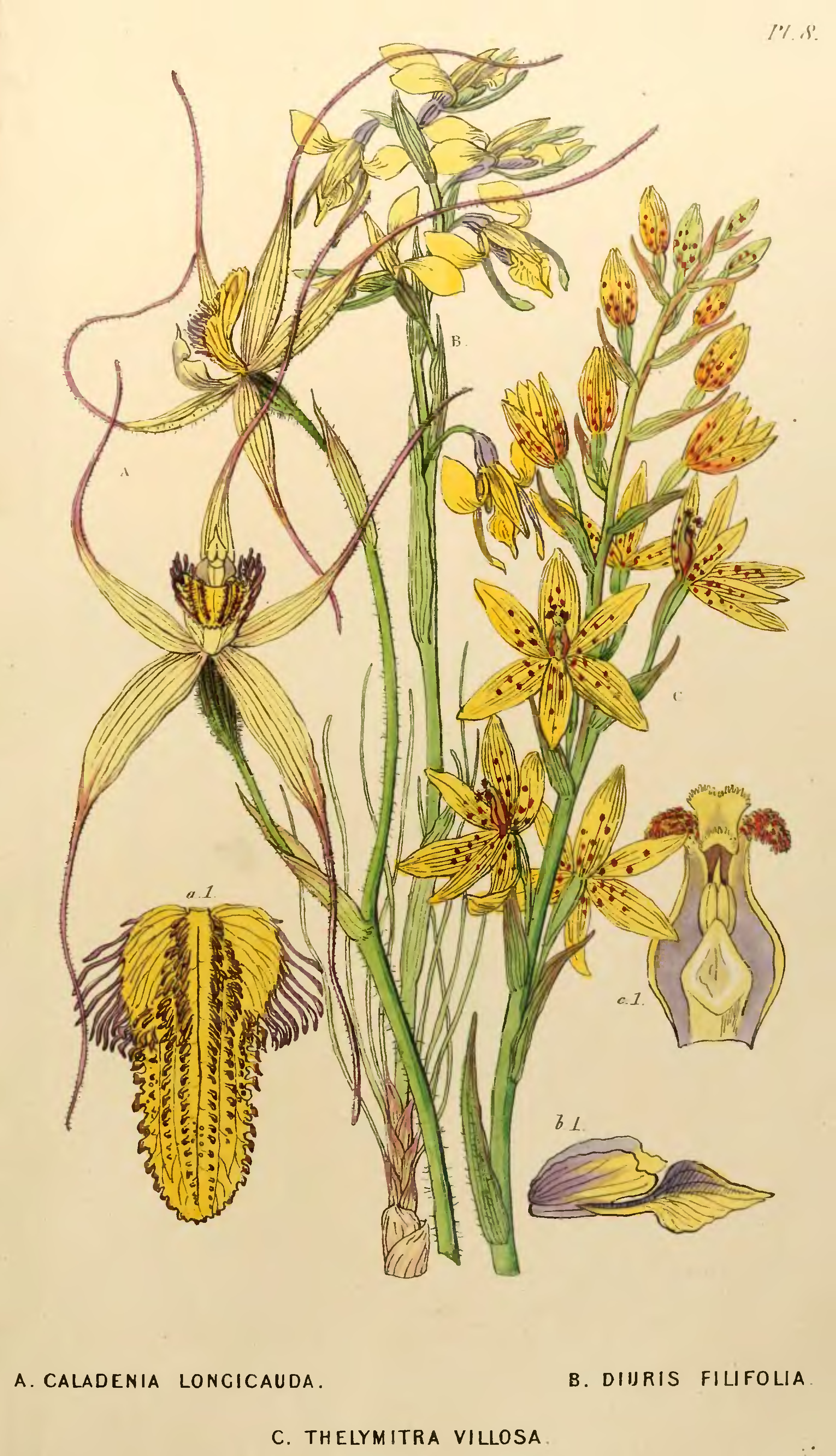
- Caladenia longicauda (A), Diuris filifolia (B) and Thelymitra villosa (C) from A Sketch of the Vegetation of the Swan River Colony.

Scientific classification
- Kingdom: Plantae
- Clade: Tracheophytes
- Clade: Angiosperms
- Clade: Monocots
- Order: Asparagales
- Family: Orchidaceae
- Subfamily: Orchidoideae
- Tribe: Diurideae
- Genus: Diuris
- Species: D. filifolia

Binomial name
- Diuris filifolia Lindl.

= Diuris filifolia =

Cat's face orchid

Species of orchid

Diuris filifolia, commonly known as the cat's face orchid, is a species of orchid which is endemic to the south-west of Western Australia. It is one of the rarest Diuris in Western Australia, sometimes flowering in large numbers but only after hot summer fires.

== Description ==
Diuris filifolia is a tuberous, perennial herb, growing to a height of 200–450 mm (8–20 in) with between six and thirteen leaves, each 50–120 mm (2–5 in) long and 1–3 mm (0.04–0.1 in) wide. There are between two and seven pale yellow flowers with reddish-brown markings and 20–25 mm (0.8–1 in) long, about 20 mm (0.8 in) wide. The dorsal sepal is more or less erect, tapers towards the tip, 10–13 mm (0.4–0.5 in) long, 7–8 mm (0.28–0.31 in) wide. The lateral sepals are 12–16 mm (0.5–0.6 in) long, 4–5 mm (0.16–0.20 in) wide and turned downwards and forwards. The petals are erect or curved backwards with the blade 9–12 mm (0.4–0.5 in) long and 6–8 mm (0.2–0.3 in) wide on a brown stalk 3–5 mm (0.1–0.2 in) long. The labellum has three lobes, the centre lobe 8–10 mm (0.3–0.4 in) long and 7–9 mm (0.3–0.4 in) wide and the side lobes 3.5–5 mm (0.1–0.2 in) long and about 4 mm (0.2 in) wide. There are two callus ridges 4–6 mm (0.16–0.24 in) long in the mid-line of the labellum. Flowering occurs from October to November and is enhanced by a hot fire the previous summer.

== Taxonomy and naming ==
Diuris filifolia was first formally described in 1840 by John Lindley and the description was published in A Sketch of the Vegetation of the Swan River Colony as an appendix to Edwards's Botanical Register. The specific epithet (filifolia) is derived from the Latin words filum meaning "thread" and folium meaning "a leaf", referring to the thin leaves at the base of the flowering stem of this species.

== Distribution and habitat ==
The cat's face orchid grows in sandy soil on the edge of winter-wet areas between York and Mount Barker in the Swan Coastal Plain biogeographic region. It is a rare Diuris which sometimes flowers in large numbers but only after hot fires the previous summer.

== Conservation ==
Diuris filifolia is classified as "not threatened" by the Western Australian Government Department of Biodiversity, Conservation and Attractions.
