= Formosum =

Formosum may refer to:

== Animals ==
- Anthidium formosum
- Aplidium formosum
- Carenum formosum
- Dorcadion formosum
- Habrocestum formosum
- Idiosoma formosum
- Trochalopteron formosum
- Nealcidion formosum

== Plants ==
- Adiantum formosum
- Anthurium formosum
- Bulbophyllum formosum
- Cratoxylum formosum
- Dendrobium formosum
- Entoloma formosum
- Gastrolobium formosum
- Genoplesium formosum
- Leucospermum formosum
- Polytrichastrum formosum
- Platylobium formosum
- Vaccinium formosum
- Rosenbergiodendron formosum

== See also ==
- Formosa
- Taiwanica
- Taiwania
- Taiwaniana
