= Taiwaniana =

Taiwaniana may refer to:

- Angelica taiwaniana
- Begonia taiwaniana
- Boehmeria taiwaniana
- Cycas taiwaniana
- Derris taiwaniana
- Ilex taiwaniana
- Prunus taiwaniana
- Siraitia taiwaniana
- Sinobaijiania taiwaniana
- Schefflera taiwaniana
- Urtica taiwaniana
- Vitis thunbergii var. taiwaniana
- × Holcosia taiwaniana

== See also ==
- Taiwan
- Taiwania (disambiguation)
- Taiwanica
- Formosum
- Taiwana
