= Taiwanica =

Taiwanica may refer to:

== Animals ==
- Aethes taiwanica
- Aegista taiwanica
- Apicalia taiwanica
- Lyonsia taiwanica
- Meretrix taiwanica
- Munidopsis taiwanica
- Ochyrotica taiwanica

== Plants ==
- Citrus taiwanica

== See also ==
- Taiwan
- Taiwania
- Formosum
- Taiwaniana
- Taiwana
