= Monocotyledon reproduction =

Flowering plant reproduction system

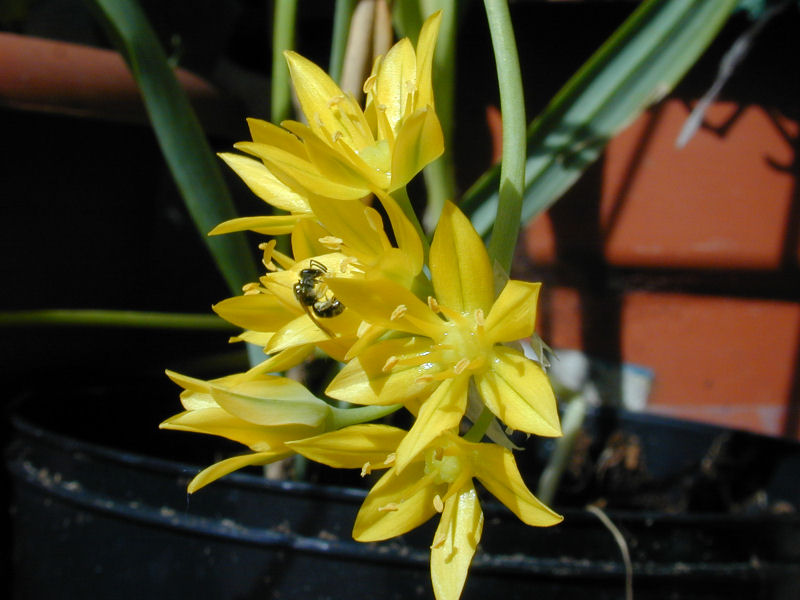
A solitary bee pollinating an Allium monocot flower.

The monocots (or monocotyledons) are one of the two major groups of flowering plants (or Angiosperms), the other being the dicots (or dicotyledons). In order to reproduce they utilize various strategies such as employing forms of asexual reproduction, restricting which individuals they are sexually compatible with, or influencing how they are pollinated. Nearly all reproductive strategies that evolved in the dicots have independently evolved in monocots as well. Despite these similarities and their close relatedness, monocots and dicots have distinct traits in their reproductive biologies.

Most monocots reproduce sexually through use of seeds that have a single cotyledon, however a great number of monocots reproduce asexually through clonal propagation. Breeding systems that utilize self-incompatibility are much more common than those that utilize self-compatibility. The majority of monocots are animal pollinated (zoophilous), of which most are pollinator generalists. Monocots have mechanisms to promote or suppress cross-fertilization (allogamy) and self-fertilization (autogamy or geitonogamy). The pollination syndromes of monocots can be quite distinct; they include having flower parts in multiples of three, adaptations to pollination by water (hydrogamy), and pollination by sexual deception in orchids.

== Methods of reproduction ==
=== Seed production ===
Reproducing through seeds is the most widespread method of reproduction in both monocots and dicots. However, internal seed structure is vastly different between these groups. The cotyledon is the embryonic leaf within a seed; monocots have one whereas dicots have two. The evolution of having one or two cotyledons may have arisen 200-150 Mya when monocots and dicots are thought to have diverged. Furthermore, the cotyledons in dicot seeds contain the endosperm which acts as the seed's food storage, while in monocot the endosperm is separated from the cotyledon. Reproduction through seeds is normally a sexual mode of reproduction, however in some cases individuals can asexually produce fertile seeds without pollination, termed apomixis.

=== Clonal propagation ===
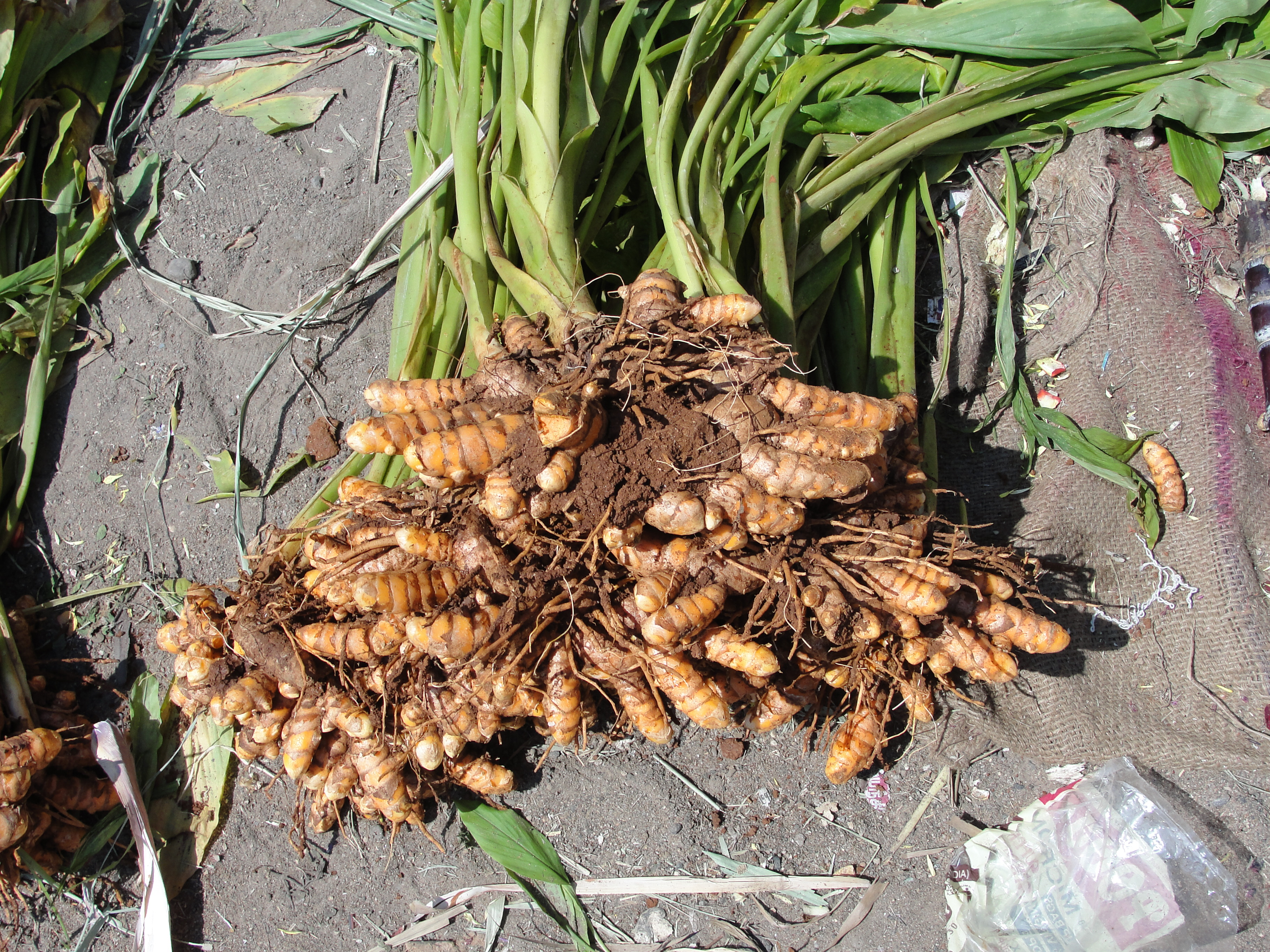
Multiple individuals have sprouted from turmeric rhizomes.

Some monocots can reproduce asexually without the need for seeds. Clonal propagation is the production or division of vegetative structures which develop into new individuals that are genetically identical to their progenitor. These vegetative structures can also form enlarged tubers that function as food storage. Monocots constitute the majority of plants with such structures, mainly in the families: Iridaceae, Liliaceae and Amaryllidaceae. There are many different types of clonal propagation, which are classified by the type of tissue propagating.

- Rhizomes are root-like stems which usually grow laterally underground or on the ground and sprout new individuals. Most plants that produce rhizomes are monocots (grasses, bamboo, ginger, galangal, turmeric, orchids, irises, lotus); these include the families: Poaceae, Zingiberaceae, Orchidaceae, Iridaceae, and Nelumbonaceae.
- Stolons (runners) are modified side-branches in which the first internode is extremely elongated and carries a new plantlet, as found in the common houseplant Chlorophytum. They can be found in grasses, irises, and orchids; these include the families: Poaceae, Iridaceae, and Orchidaceae.
- Bulbs are underground food storage structures made from leaves which cycle through periods of vegetative and reproductive growth. Nearly all bulb producing plants are monocots (onion, lily, tulip, hyacinth, irises); these include the families: Amaryllidaceae, Liliaceae, Asparagaceae, and Iridaceae.
- Corms are underground swollen stems that act as food storage; they appear similar to bulbs but are not layered with leaves. New corms will bud around the base of the stem. Corms can be found in irises, taro, arrowheads, sedges, and bananas; these include: Iridaceae, Araceae, Alismataceae, Asparagaceae, Colchicaceae, Cyperaceae, and Musaceae.
- Keikis are clonal individuals that grow from the flowering stems of Orchids.

== Breeding systems ==
Monocots can be classified as perfect (having bisexual flowers), monoecious (having separate male and female flowers on the same plant), dioecious (having flowers of only one sex on an individual) and polygamous (having bisexual flowers with male and/or female flowers on the same plant). Plants that are dioecious have no other option but to mate with different individuals, but in all other cases there is the possibility that an individual's pollen may make contact with its own stigma. For this reason, most plants have genetic mechanisms to prevent fertilization from pollen grains that are too closely related to the stigma (self-incompatibility). The mechanisms of breeding systems occur at the molecular level through a biochemical reaction on the stigma that recognizes genetic differences in pollen grains. Depending on the species, individual plants can self-pollinate, individuals plants can cross-pollinate intraspecifically (between individuals of the same species), or individuals can cross-pollinate interspecifically (between individuals of different species) and hybridize. Orchids are known to have weak barriers to hybridization.

=== Self-incompatibility ===
Mating with individuals that are too closely related (i.e. with self) may result in inbreeding depression, so it is usually considered advantageous to cross-pollinate intraspecifically, in which case self-incompatibility is utilized. At least 27 families of monocots have genetic mechanisms to ensure self-incompatibility (SI). The most widespread form of self-incompatibility in monocots is gametophytic, meaning compatibility is determined by the genotype of the pollen grain. There are two described mechanisms of gametophytic self-incompatibility that have been shown to occur in four families of dicots (RNase and S-glycoprotein) but none have been found in monocots. However, there is evidence that orchids have an alternative undescribed mechanism of gametophytic self-incompatibility.

Homomorphic sporophytic self-incompatibility has not yet been discovered in monocots. In this form compatibility is determined by the genotype of the anther from which the pollen grain was created. Heteromorphic sporophytic self-incompatibility, a mechanism in heterostylous flowers, has been shown to occur in only one family of monocots, Pontederiaceae. Late-acting (ovarian) self-incompatibility has been described in Agavaceae, Iridaceae, and Amaryllidaceae.

Grasses have a mechanism of self-incompatibility unique to themselves; they employ two unlinked loci, S and Z. When the alleles at these loci are equivalent between a pollen grain and a stigma on which it lands then the pollen grain will be rejected.

=== Self-compatibility ===
Self-compatible (SC) pollination systems are less common than self-incompatibile cross-pollination systems in angiosperms. However, when the probability of cross-pollination is too low it can be advantageous to self-pollinate. Self-pollination is known to be favored in some orchids, rices, and Caulokaempferia coenobialis (Zingiberaceae).

== Pollination ecology ==
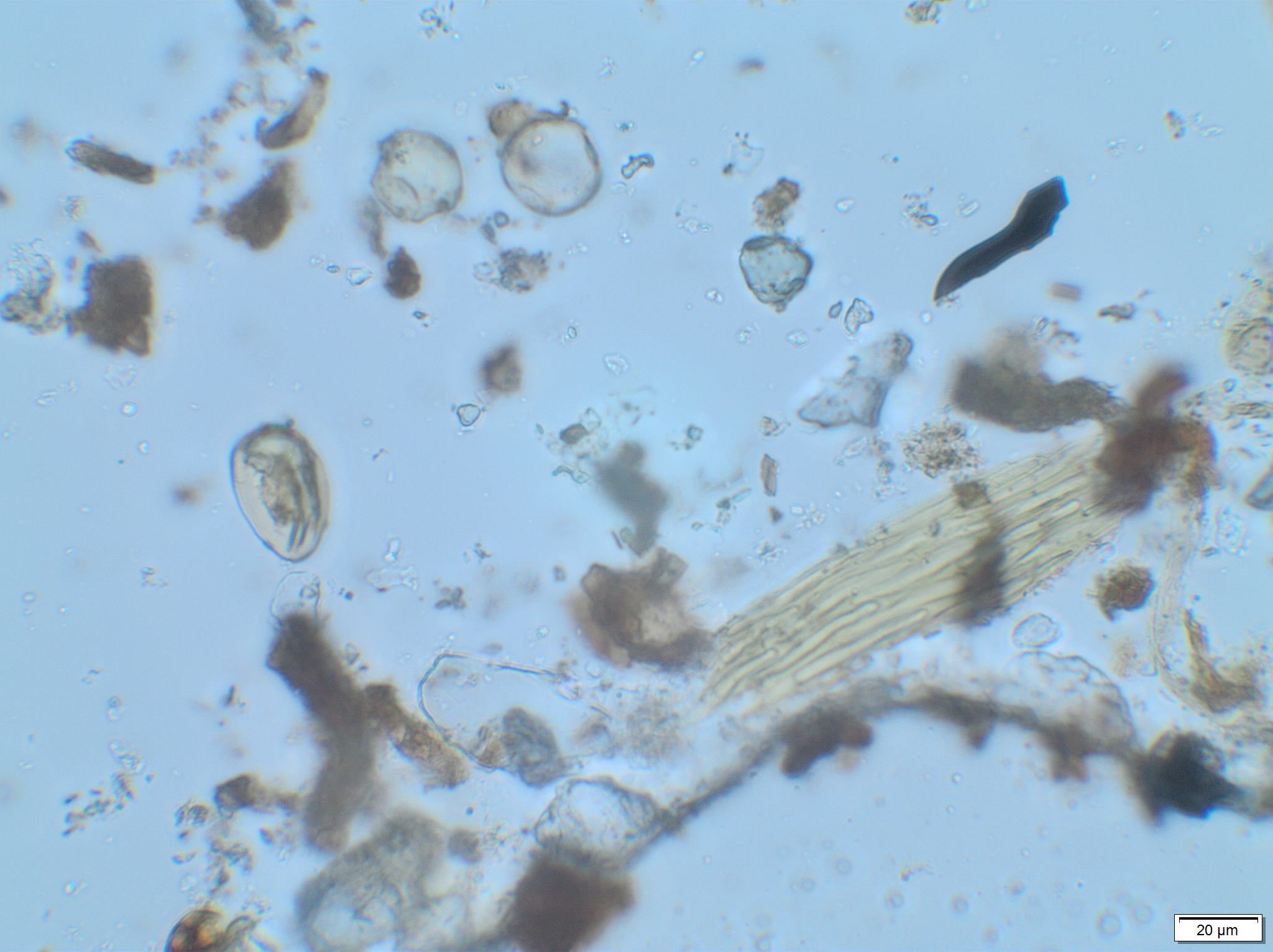
Processed, fossilised pollen from the family Poaceae. Species unknown.

Pollination systems in monocots are just as diverse as in dicots. About two thirds of monocots evolved to be zoophilous (animal pollinated). Others are instead water-pollinated or wind-pollinated such as Cyperaceae, Juncaceae, Sparganiaceae, Typhaceae, and most notably Poaceae. These modes evolved to facilitate transfer of the pollen grain onto the stigma. Most zoophilous monocots are pollinator generalists with the most notable exception being the Orchids. Monocot pollen grains are monocolpate, meaning they have one groove; outer surfaces called exines are smooth.

=== Pollination strategies ===
All monocots utilize either cross-pollination or self-pollination strategies, as do dicots, but the advantage of either strategy depends on ecological factors such as pollinator abundance and competition. These strategies either promote fertilization with self and suppress fertilization with others resulting in self-pollination, or they suppress fertilization with self and promote fertilization with others resulting in cross-pollination. Strategies also exist to suppress fertilization with other species as reproductive barriers.

Pollination strategies have the same function as breeding systems, however they occur at the ecological level or at the level of floral structure rather than at the molecular level on the stigma through genetic recognition

==== Cross-pollination (allogamy) ====
Self-pollination can be prevented by both physical and temporal mechanisms that have evolved in response to the interactions with pollen vectors; these mechanisms make cross-pollination easier to accomplish by lowering the chances of self-pollination. For example, dichogamy, which is the temporal differentiation in the ripening of sexual organs, is common in monocots with both protogynous and protoandrous flowers. Herkogamy, which is the spatial separation of sexual organs, is also present in many monocots.

==== Self-pollination (autogamy and geitonogamy) ====
Self-pollination can occur with or without the aid of animals. When animal-mediated, sexual organs will be positioned closer spatially and temporally, inverse to the strategies of dichogamy and herkogamy. However, when self-pollination is self-induced by the flower, some unique mechanisms have evolved. In Caulokaempferia coenobialis (Zingiberaceae), pollen is transported via a drop of oil that forms on the anther and slowly slides down to the stigma. In the orchid, Paphiopedilum parishii, anthers liquify and touch the stigma with the help of gravity rather than a pollinator. Another orchid, Holcoglossum amesianum, rotates its anther in circles to transfer pollen into its stigma cavity.

==== Apomixis (agamospermy) ====
Apomixis is asexual reproduction through seeds and does not require pollination. It is distributed throughout the monocot clade in Poales, Asparagales, Liliales, Dioscoreales, and Alismatales. Thus apomixis may have evolved once in a basal ancestor and has since repeatedly become lost.

=== Pollination syndromes ===
Pollination syndromes are floral adaptations in response to pollen vectors, such as the production of nectar.

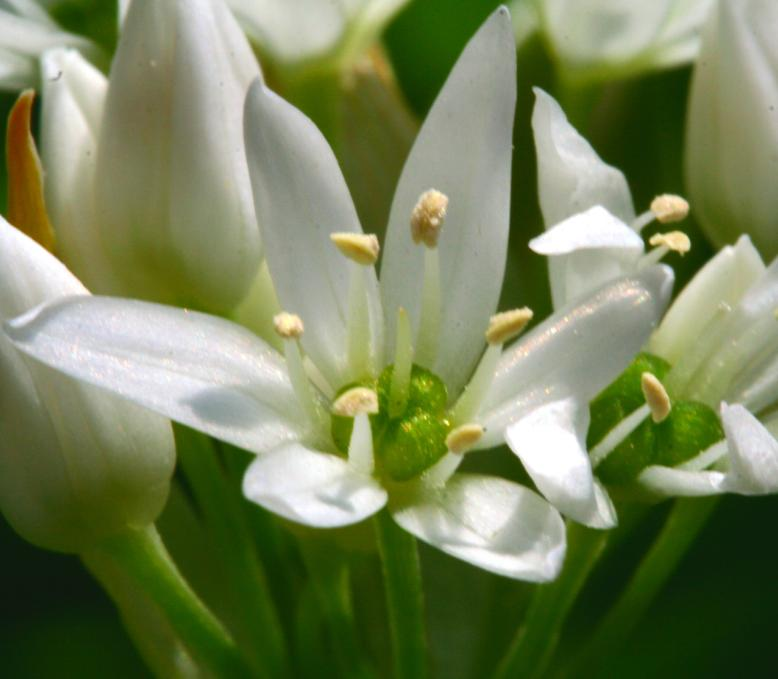
The Allium flower has six stamens and six tepals.

==== Floral morphology ====
Flower structure is more uniformly distributed within the monocots. Monocot flowers occur with parts having multiples of three; usually there are three stamen, three petals and three sepals (six tepals), and usually just one stigma. However stamens in twos can be found in Cypripedioideae while single fertile stamens can be found in Philydraceae, Zingiberaceae, and as gynostemium in Orchidacaea. Furthermore, flower structures that evolved to trap insects to accomplish pollination are found in many monocot genera. In relation to flower arrangement alone, plants with perfect flowers should be most likely to self-pollinate while dioecious plants should be most likely to cross-pollinate.

==== Animal pollination ====
Zoophily, or animal pollination, is a method of pollination which utilizes animals as pollen vectors.

In order for pollen to affix to animal bodies, a tryphine coating is usually present in zoophilous pollen to achieve an adhesive pollen grain.

Visual attractants of monocot flowers mainly come from the coloration of tepals. However, when species with small green tepals are zoophilous other organs can evolve to be visually attractive such as having colored bracts (Araceae, Cyclanthaceae, and some Arecaceae), otherwise attraction is based on scent only. The similar pigments used in monocot and dicot flower coloration have independently evolved.

Many monocots produce scent to attract pollinators but perhaps not as many as those that produce nectar.

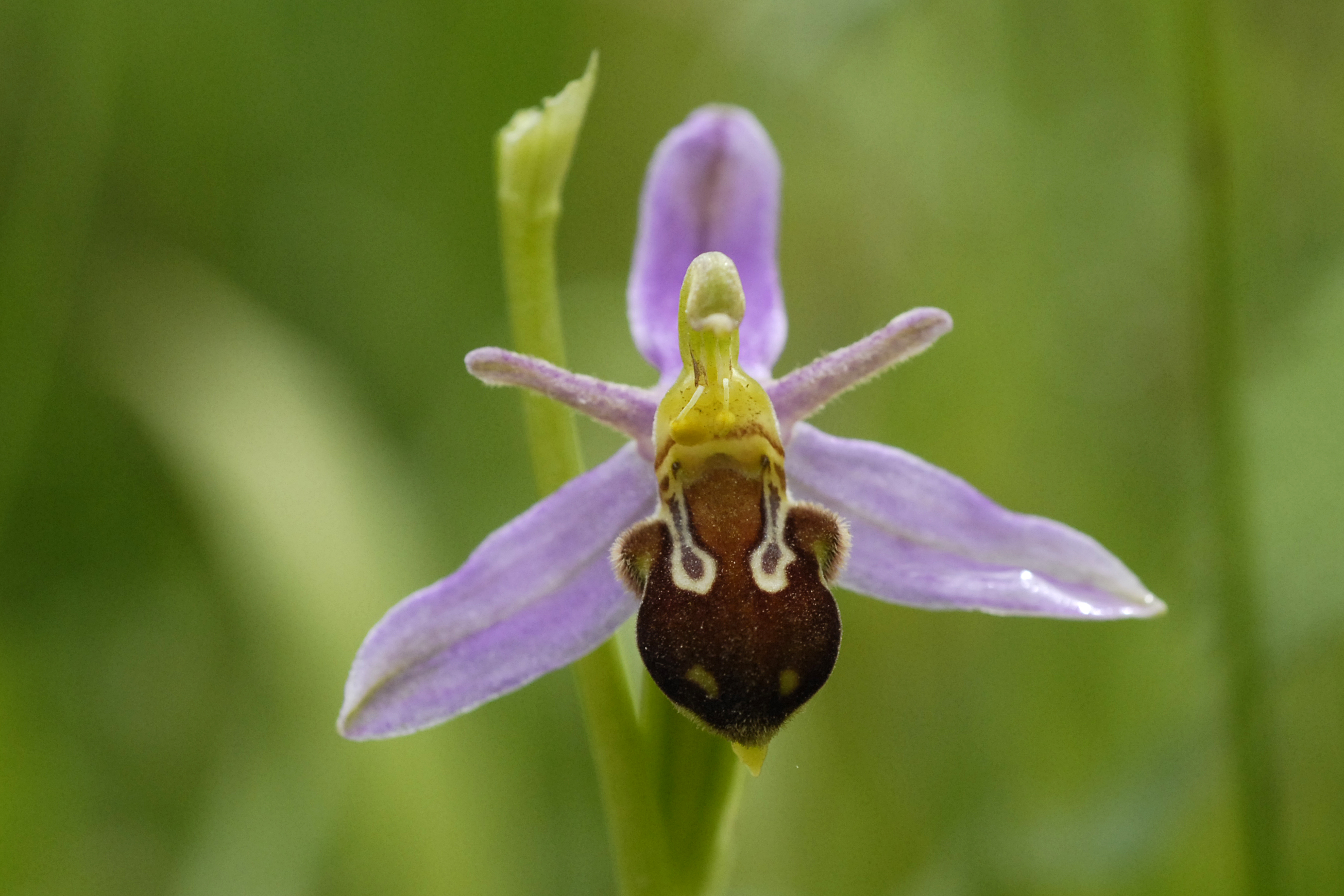
A bee orchid, Ophrys, mimics a female bee as a false reward.

Most zoophilous monocots produce nectar as a reward and this nectar is alike to nectar of dicots. Carpellary septal nectaries are common and unique to monocots. Nonseptal nectaries are most often epithelial and positioned on the perigonal nectaries of tepals when occurring in monocots. Also, nectar can be produced in perigonal unicellular hairs, a trait only observed in monocots. Monocots do not have disc nectaries whereas in dicots they are widespread.

Like dicots, some zoophilous monocots do not produce nectar and instead offer pollen as the main reward. A few even offer other rewards: oils to bees, starchy tissue to beetles, sleeping holes to bees, and a perfume which Euglossini male bees will collect and present on their legs during mating displays. Deceptive flowers that do not offer actual rewards are much more widespread in monocots than dicots, with the most common perpetrator being the orchids. Orchids commonly provide empty nectar spurs. One genus, Ophrys, is known for its ability to mimic female bees to such a degree that it fools male bees into pseudocopulating with the "female" and thereby pollinating the flower.

==== Wind pollination ====
Most wind-pollinated plants do not produce nectar, attractive scents, or petals because they are not adapted to pollination by animal vectors. Grasses are a large wind-pollinated group; their stigmas are often feathery to help catch pollen in the wind.

==== Water pollination ====
Monocots account for nearly all hydrophilous or water-pollinated plants. These are monocots that are adapted to use water as a vector and constitute most of the aquatic plants. Depending on the species, pollen can either float on the surface and disperse by wind and water currents towards other surface-floating flowers, or pollen can drift underwater to flowers that are submerged. In the later scenario, pollen is without an exine and stigmas are forked.

=== The flowering bamboo phenomenon ===
A few species of bamboos can grow for more than 120 years without flowering. Then at once flowering can simultaneously occur in groves across the world, termed gregarious or mast flowering. This is possible because the trigger to flower is genetically determined and because multiple forests can develop from the clones of one individual. The cause of the trigger is still unknown and unpredictable. During anthesis, or flowering, pollination is wind-mediated but bee pollination has been observed in at least 6 species. When pollination is zoophilous flowers can be fragrant and attract large numbers of pollinator-collecting bees to congregate around the inflorescence and take advantage of this new and abundant source of pollen. After anthesis massive die-offs of all sister groves occur within three years of each other and can have devastating effects.

== See also ==
- Monocotyledon
- Plant Reproduction
- Mating System
- Self-incompatibility
- Self-pollination
- Pollination
- Pollination Syndrome
- Poaceae in Palaeoecological Reconstructions
