= Self-pollination =

Form of pollination

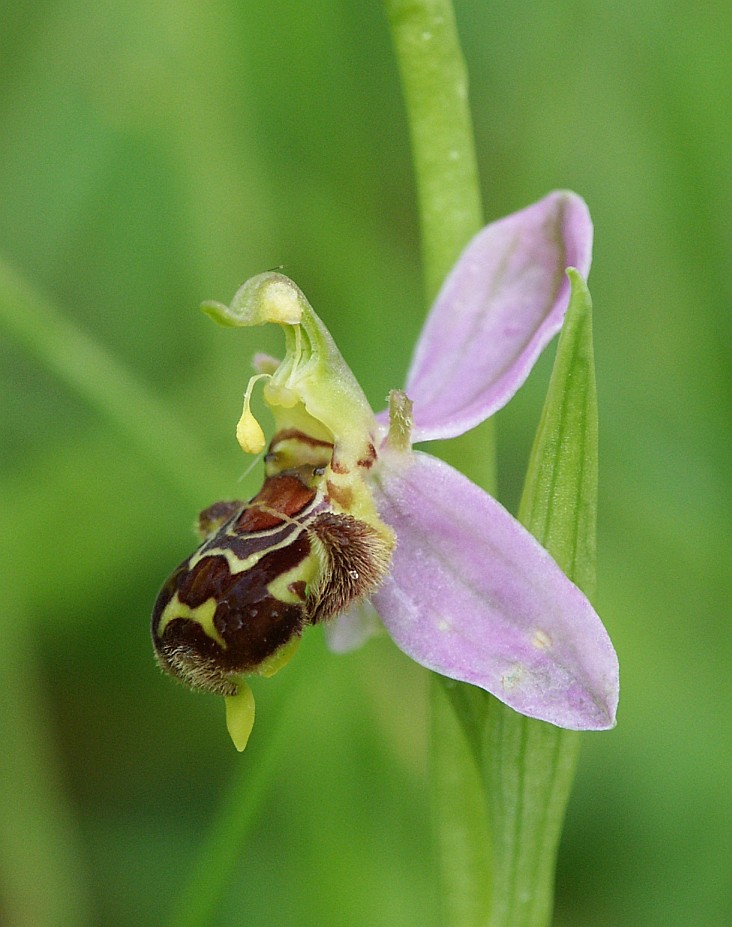
One type of automatic self-pollination occurs in the orchid Ophrys apifera. One of the two pollinia bends itself towards the stigma.

Self-pollination is a form of pollination in which pollen arrives at the stigma of a flower (in flowering plants) or at the ovule (in gymnosperms) of the same plant. The term cross-pollination is used for the opposite case, where pollen from one plant moves to a different plant.

There are two types of self-pollination: in autogamy, pollen is transferred to the stigma of the same flower; in geitonogamy, pollen is transferred from the anther of one flower to the stigma of another flower on the same flowering plant, or from microsporangium to ovule within a single (monoecious) gymnosperm. Some plants have mechanisms that ensure autogamy, such as flowers that do not open (cleistogamy), or stamens that move to come into contact with the stigma.

The term selfing that is often used as a synonym is not limited to self-pollination, but also applies to other types of self-fertilization.

== Occurrence ==
Few plants self-pollinate without the aid of pollen vectors (such as wind or insects). The mechanism is seen most often in some legumes such as peanuts. In another legume, soybeans, the flowers open and remain receptive to insect cross pollination during the day. If this is not accomplished, the flowers self-pollinate as they are closing. Among other plants that can self-pollinate are many kinds of orchids, peas, sunflowers and tridax. Most of the self-pollinating plants have small, relatively inconspicuous flowers that shed pollen directly onto the stigma, sometimes even before the bud opens. Self-pollinated plants expend less energy in the production of pollinator attractants and can grow in areas where the kinds of insects or other animals that might visit them are absent or very scarce—as in the Arctic or at high elevations.

Self-pollination limits the variety of progeny and may depress plant vigor. However, self-pollination can be advantageous, allowing plants to spread beyond the range of suitable pollinators or produce offspring in areas where pollinator populations have been greatly reduced or are naturally variable.

Pollination can also be accomplished by cross-pollination. Cross-pollination is the transfer of pollen, by wind or animals such as insects and birds, from the anther to the stigma of flowers on separate plants.

== Types of self-pollinating flowers ==
Both hermaphrodite and monoecious species have the potential for self-pollination leading to self-fertilization unless there is a mechanism to avoid it. Eighty percent of all flowering plants are hermaphroditic, meaning they contain both sexes in the same flower, while 5 percent of plant species are monoecious, having flowers of both sexes on a single plant. The remaining 15% would therefore be dioecious (each plant unisexual). Plants that self-pollinate include several types of orchids, and sunflowers. Dandelions are capable of self-pollination as well as cross-pollination.

== Advantages ==
There are several advantages for self-pollinating flowers. Firstly, if a given genotype is well-suited for an environment, self-pollination helps to keep this trait stable in the species. Not being dependent on pollinating agents allows self-pollination to occur when bees and wind are nowhere to be found. Self-pollination or cross pollination can be an advantage when the number of flowers is small or they are widely spaced. During self-pollination, the pollen grains are not transmitted from one flower to another. As a result, there is less wastage of pollen. Also, self-pollinating plants do not depend on external carriers. They also cannot make changes in their characters and so the features of a species can be maintained with purity. Self-pollination also helps to preserve parental characters as the gametes from the same flower are evolved. It is not necessary for flowers to produce nectar, scent, or to be colourful in order to attract pollinators.

== Disadvantages ==
The disadvantages of self-pollination come from a lack of variation that allows no adaptation to the changing environment or potential pathogen attack. Self-pollination can lead to inbreeding depression caused by expression of deleterious recessive mutations, or to the reduced health of the species, due to the breeding of related specimens. This is why many flowers that could potentially self-pollinate have a built-in mechanism to avoid it, or make it second choice at best. Genetic defects in self-pollinating plants cannot be eliminated by genetic recombination and offspring can only avoid inheriting the deleterious attributes through a chance mutation arising in a gamete.

== Mixed mating ==
About 42% of flowering plants exhibit a mixed mating system in nature. In the most common kind of system, individual plants produce a single flower type and fruits may contain self-pollinated, out-crossed or a mixture of progeny types. Another mixed mating system is referred to as dimorphic cleistogamy. In this system a single plant produces both open, potentially out-crossed and closed, obligately self-pollinated cleistogamous flowers.

== Example species ==
The evolutionary shift from outcrossing to self-fertilization is one of the most common evolutionary transitions in plants. About 10-15% of flowering plants are predominantly self-fertilizing. A few well-studied examples of self-pollinating species are described below.

=== Orchids ===
Self-pollination in the slipper orchid Paphiopedilum parishii occurs when the anther changes from a solid to a liquid state and directly contacts the stigma surface without the aid of any pollinating agent.

The tree-living orchid Holcoglossum amesianum has a type of self-pollination mechanism in which the bisexual flower turns its anther against gravity through 360° in order to insert pollen into its own stigma cavity—without the aid of any pollinating agent or medium. This type of self-pollination appears to be an adaptation to the windless, drought conditions that are present when flowering occurs, at a time when insects are scarce. Without pollinators for outcrossing, the necessity of ensuring reproductive success appears to outweigh potential adverse effects of inbreeding. Such an adaptation may be widespread among species in similar environments.

Self-pollination in the Madagascan orchid Bulbophyllum bicoloratum occurs by virtue of a rostellum that may have regained its stigmatic function as part of the distal median stigmatic lobe.

=== Caulokaempferia coenobialis ===
In the Chinese herb Caulokaempferia coenobialis a film of pollen is transported from the anther (pollen sacs) by an oily emulsion that slides sideways along the flower's style and into the individual's own stigma. The lateral flow of the film of pollen along the style appears to be due solely to the spreading properties of the oily emulsion and not to gravity. This strategy may have evolved to cope with a scarcity of pollinators in the extremely shady and humid habitats of C. coenobialis.

=== Capsella rubella ===
Capsella rubella (Red Shepherd's Purse) is a self-pollinating species that became self-compatible 50,000 to 100,000 years ago, indicating that self-pollination is an evolutionary adaptation that can persist over many generations. Its out-crossing progenitor was identified as Capsella grandiflora.

=== Arabidopsis thaliana ===
Arabidopsis thaliana is a predominantly self-pollinating plant with an out-crossing rate in the wild estimated at less than 0.3%. A study suggested that self-pollination evolved roughly a million years ago or more.

=== Tomato ===
In the tomato plant, cleistogamy, a form of automatic self-pollination, is promoted by a modification of floral structures. This modification involves formation of a stigma enclosing floral structure.

== Possible long-term benefit of meiosis ==
Meiosis followed by self-pollination produces little overall genetic variation. This raises the question of how meiosis in self-pollinating plants is adaptively maintained over extended periods (i.e. for roughly a million years or more, as in the case of A. thaliana) in preference to a less complicated and less costly asexual ameiotic process for producing progeny. An adaptive benefit of meiosis that may explain its long-term maintenance in self-pollinating plants is efficient recombinational repair of DNA damage. This benefit can be realized at each generation (even when genetic variation is not produced).

== See also ==
- Self-incompatibility: genetic mechanisms which prevent self-fertilization
- Reproduction
- Monocotyledon reproduction
