= L. gouldii =

L. gouldii may refer to:

- Lophornis gouldii, the dot-eared coquette, a hummingbird species found in Bolivia and Brazil
- Lyonsia gouldii, Dall, 1915, a species in the genus Lyonsia and the family Lyonsiidae

== See also ==
- Gouldii (disambiguation)
