= Nealcidion latum =

Scientific classification
- Kingdom: Animalia
- Phylum: Arthropoda
- Class: Insecta
- Order: Coleoptera
- Suborder: Polyphaga
- Infraorder: Cucujiformia
- Family: Cerambycidae
- Genus: Nealcidion
- Species: N. latum

Binomial name
- Nealcidion latum (Thomson, 1860)

Species of beetle

Nealcidion latum is a species of beetle in the family Cerambycidae. It was described by Thomson in 1860.
