= Nealcidion griseum =

Scientific classification
- Kingdom: Animalia
- Phylum: Arthropoda
- Class: Insecta
- Order: Coleoptera
- Suborder: Polyphaga
- Infraorder: Cucujiformia
- Family: Cerambycidae
- Genus: Nealcidion
- Species: N. griseum

Binomial name
- Nealcidion griseum (Aurivillius, 1900)

Species of beetle

Nealcidion griseum is a species of beetle in the family Cerambycidae. It was described by Per Olof Christopher Aurivillius in 1900.
