= Nealcidion elegans =

Scientific classification
- Kingdom: Animalia
- Phylum: Arthropoda
- Class: Insecta
- Order: Coleoptera
- Suborder: Polyphaga
- Infraorder: Cucujiformia
- Family: Cerambycidae
- Genus: Nealcidion
- Species: N. elegans

Binomial name
- Nealcidion elegans Monne & Monne, 2009

Species of beetle

Nealcidion elegans is a species of beetle in the family Cerambycidae. It was described by Monne and Monne in 2009.
