= Nealcidion cuspidatum =

Scientific classification
- Kingdom: Animalia
- Phylum: Arthropoda
- Class: Insecta
- Order: Coleoptera
- Suborder: Polyphaga
- Infraorder: Cucujiformia
- Family: Cerambycidae
- Genus: Nealcidion
- Species: N. cuspidatum

Binomial name
- Nealcidion cuspidatum Monné, 1998

Species of beetle

Nealcidion cuspidatum is a species of beetle in the family Cerambycidae. It was described by Monné in 1998. Specimens have been found in Mexico.
