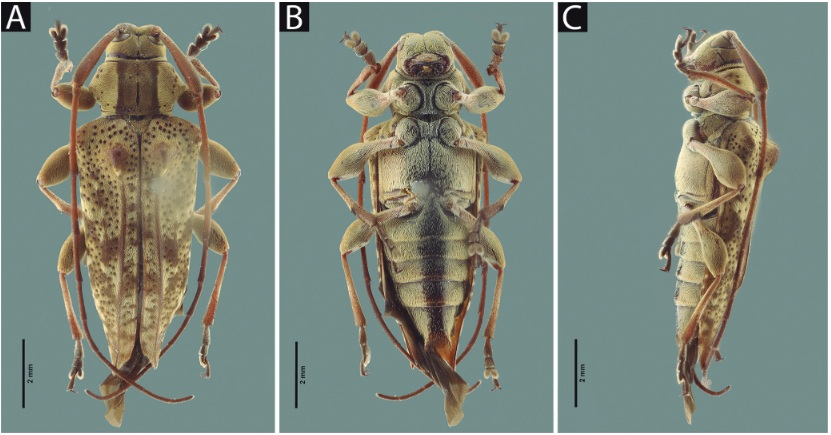

Scientific classification
- Kingdom: Animalia
- Phylum: Arthropoda
- Clade: Pancrustacea
- Class: Insecta
- Order: Coleoptera
- Suborder: Polyphaga
- Infraorder: Cucujiformia
- Family: Cerambycidae
- Genus: Nealcidion
- Species: N. santossilvai

Binomial name
- Nealcidion santossilvai Ávila-Jimenez & Botero, 2026

= Nealcidion santossilvai =

Species of beetle

Nealcidion santossilvai is a species of beetle of the family Cerambycidae. It is found in Colombia.

== Description ==
Adults reach a length of about 8.7–10 mm (0.34–0.39 in). The integument is mostly dark brown, with the ventral mouthparts dark (except for the blackish palpomeres, with the apex of maxillary palpomeres IV and labial palpomeres III yellow). The labrum is dark brown, except for the yellowish‑brown anterior quarter and the mandibles dark reddish brown on the basal two-thirds, and blackish on the apical third. The scape is brown, but more yellowish laterally. The antennomeres are reddish‑orange, gradually darkening toward the apex of the antennae. The trochanters, basal third of the profemora, ventral surface of the protibiae, and margins of ventrites 3‑5 are reddish brown.

== Etymology ==
The species is named in honour of Antonio Santos‑Silva, in recognition of his assistance in identifying the new species and for his constant help and friendship with the authors.
