= Nealcidion cereicola =

Scientific classification
- Kingdom: Animalia
- Phylum: Arthropoda
- Class: Insecta
- Order: Coleoptera
- Suborder: Polyphaga
- Infraorder: Cucujiformia
- Family: Cerambycidae
- Genus: Nealcidion
- Species: N. cereicola

Binomial name
- Nealcidion cereicola (Fisher, 1936)

Species of beetle

Nealcidion cereicola is a species of beetle in the family Cerambycidae. It was described by Fisher in 1936.
