= Holcoglossum nagalandense =

Scientific classification
- Kingdom: Plantae
- Clade: Tracheophytes
- Clade: Angiosperms
- Clade: Monocots
- Order: Asparagales
- Family: Orchidaceae
- Subfamily: Epidendroideae
- Genus: Holcoglossum
- Species: H. nagalandense

Binomial name
- Holcoglossum nagalandense (Phukan & Odyuo) X.H.Jin

Synonyms
- Penkimia nagalandensis Phukan & Odyuo; Chenorchis singchii Z.J.Liu, K.W.Liu & L.J.Chen

Species of orchid

Holcoglossum nagalandense is a species of terrestrial orchid native to high elevations (1,600–2,000 metres or 5,200–6,600 feet) in the Himalayas of Yunnan and Nagaland. When placed in the former genus Penkimia as Penkimia nagalandensis it was the only species.
