= Nealcidion furciferum =

Scientific classification
- Kingdom: Animalia
- Phylum: Arthropoda
- Class: Insecta
- Order: Coleoptera
- Suborder: Polyphaga
- Infraorder: Cucujiformia
- Family: Cerambycidae
- Genus: Nealcidion
- Species: N. furciferum

Binomial name
- Nealcidion furciferum (Bates, 1881)

Species of beetle

Nealcidion furciferum is a species of beetle in the family Cerambycidae. It was described by Bates in 1881.
