= × Holcosia taiwaniana =

Scientific classification
- Kingdom: Plantae
- Clade: Tracheophytes
- Clade: Angiosperms
- Clade: Monocots
- Order: Asparagales
- Family: Orchidaceae
- Subfamily: Epidendroideae
- Tribe: Vandeae
- Subtribe: Aeridinae
- Hybrid: Luisia teres × Holcoglossum quasipinifolium
- distribution of × Holcosia taiwaniana

Synonyms
- Papilionanthe taiwaniana (S.S.Ying) Ormerod (2002); × Papilisia taiwaniana (S.S.Ying) J.M.H.Shaw (2004); Vanda taiwaniana S.S.Ying (1989)

Artificial hybrid species of orchid

× Holcosia taiwaniana is a natural hybrid of the orchid species Holcoglossum quasipinifolium and Luisia teres. It is an epiphyte endemic to Taiwan.

== Description ==
The occasionally branched, pendulous, terete stems are 30 to 60 cm in length and 4 to 4.5 mm wide. The terete, 14 to 21 cm long and 2 to 3.5 mm wide leaves are not strictly distichously arranged, but rather laxly alternate. Two 4–5 cm wide, yellowish flowers are produced on 2 to 3 cm long inflorescences. The labellum bears brown-red longitudinal stripes. H. taiwaniana bears a resemblance to H. pseudotaiwaniana, but lacks the latter's distinct wedge-shape along the epichile.
