= Nealcidion parallelum =

Scientific classification
- Kingdom: Animalia
- Phylum: Arthropoda
- Class: Insecta
- Order: Coleoptera
- Suborder: Polyphaga
- Infraorder: Cucujiformia
- Family: Cerambycidae
- Genus: Nealcidion
- Species: N. parallelum

Binomial name
- Nealcidion parallelum (Monné & Martins, 1976)

Species of beetle

Nealcidion parallelum is a species of beetle in the family Cerambycidae. It was described by Monné and Martins in 1976.
