= Nealcidion adjunctum =

Scientific classification
- Kingdom: Animalia
- Phylum: Arthropoda
- Class: Insecta
- Order: Coleoptera
- Suborder: Polyphaga
- Infraorder: Cucujiformia
- Family: Cerambycidae
- Genus: Nealcidion
- Species: N. adjunctum

Binomial name
- Nealcidion adjunctum (Thomson, 1865)

Species of beetle

Nealcidion adjunctum is a species of beetle in the family Cerambycidae. It was described by Thomson in 1865.
