= Nealcidion decoratum =

Scientific classification
- Kingdom: Animalia
- Phylum: Arthropoda
- Class: Insecta
- Order: Coleoptera
- Suborder: Polyphaga
- Infraorder: Cucujiformia
- Family: Cerambycidae
- Genus: Nealcidion
- Species: N. decoratum

Binomial name
- Nealcidion decoratum (Melzer, 1932)

Species of beetle

Nealcidion decoratum is a species of beetle in the family Cerambycidae. It was described by Melzer in 1932.
