= Nealcidion cyllenoide =

Scientific classification
- Kingdom: Animalia
- Phylum: Arthropoda
- Class: Insecta
- Order: Coleoptera
- Suborder: Polyphaga
- Infraorder: Cucujiformia
- Family: Cerambycidae
- Genus: Nealcidion
- Species: N. cyllenoide

Binomial name
- Nealcidion cyllenoide (Aurivillius, 1925)

Species of beetle

Nealcidion cyllenoide is a species of beetle in the family Cerambycidae. It was described by Per Olof Christopher Aurivillius in 1925.
