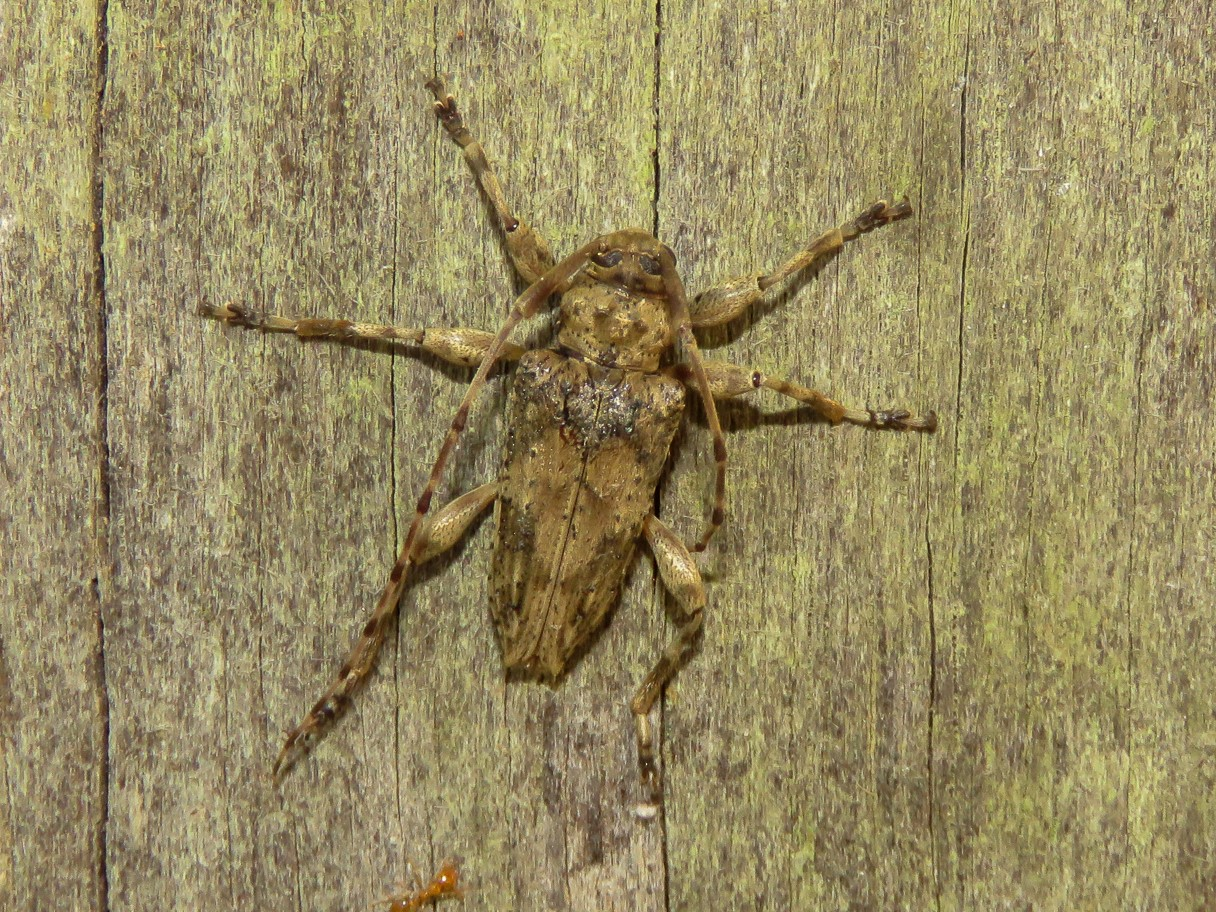

Scientific classification
- Kingdom: Animalia
- Phylum: Arthropoda
- Clade: Pancrustacea
- Class: Insecta
- Order: Coleoptera
- Suborder: Polyphaga
- Infraorder: Cucujiformia
- Family: Cerambycidae
- Genus: Nealcidion
- Species: N. bicristatum

Binomial name
- Nealcidion bicristatum (Bates, 1863)

= Nealcidion bicristatum =

Species of beetle

Nealcidion bicristatum is a species of beetle in the family Cerambycidae. It was described by Bates in 1863. It is found in Brazil (Ceará, Pernambuco, Rio Grande do Norte, Tocantins, Bahia, Minas Gerais, Espírito Santo, Rio de Janeiro, São Paulo, Paraná, Santa Catarina, Rio Grande do Sul), Bolivia (Santa Cruz), Paraguay, Argentina (Misiones, Corrientes, Buenos Aires) and Uruguay.
