= Nealcidion socium =

Scientific classification
- Kingdom: Animalia
- Phylum: Arthropoda
- Class: Insecta
- Order: Coleoptera
- Suborder: Polyphaga
- Infraorder: Cucujiformia
- Family: Cerambycidae
- Genus: Nealcidion
- Species: N. socium

Binomial name
- Nealcidion socium (Gahan, 1895)

Species of beetle

Nealcidion socium is a species of beetle in the family Cerambycidae. It was described by Gahan in 1895.
