= Nealcidion omissum =

Scientific classification
- Kingdom: Animalia
- Phylum: Arthropoda
- Class: Insecta
- Order: Coleoptera
- Suborder: Polyphaga
- Infraorder: Cucujiformia
- Family: Cerambycidae
- Genus: Nealcidion
- Species: N. omissum

Binomial name
- Nealcidion omissum (Martins & Monné, 1974)

Species of beetle

Nealcidion omissum is a species of beetle in the family Cerambycidae. It was described by Martins and Monné in 1974.
