= Taiwania (disambiguation) =

Taiwania may refer to:

- Acaulospora taiwania, a fungus
- Taiwania cryptomerioides, a large coniferous tree
- Taiwania (supercomputer), a supercomputer series
  - Taiwania 3, supercomputer introduced in 2021

== See also ==
- Formosum
- Taiwan
- Taiwanica
- Taiwaniana
- Taiwana
