= Nealcidion eulophum =

Scientific classification
- Kingdom: Animalia
- Phylum: Arthropoda
- Class: Insecta
- Order: Coleoptera
- Suborder: Polyphaga
- Infraorder: Cucujiformia
- Family: Cerambycidae
- Genus: Nealcidion
- Species: N. eulophum

Binomial name
- Nealcidion eulophum (Bates, 1881)

Species of beetle

Nealcidion eulophum is a species of beetle in the family Cerambycidae. It was described by Bates in 1881. It has been found in Mexico, Honduras, Guatemala, Belize and Costa Rica.
