= Nealcidion latipenne =

Scientific classification
- Kingdom: Animalia
- Phylum: Arthropoda
- Class: Insecta
- Order: Coleoptera
- Suborder: Polyphaga
- Infraorder: Cucujiformia
- Family: Cerambycidae
- Genus: Nealcidion
- Species: N. latipenne

Binomial name
- Nealcidion latipenne (Bates, 1863)

Species of beetle

Nealcidion latipenne is a species of beetle in the family Cerambycidae. It was described by Henry Walter Bates in 1863.
