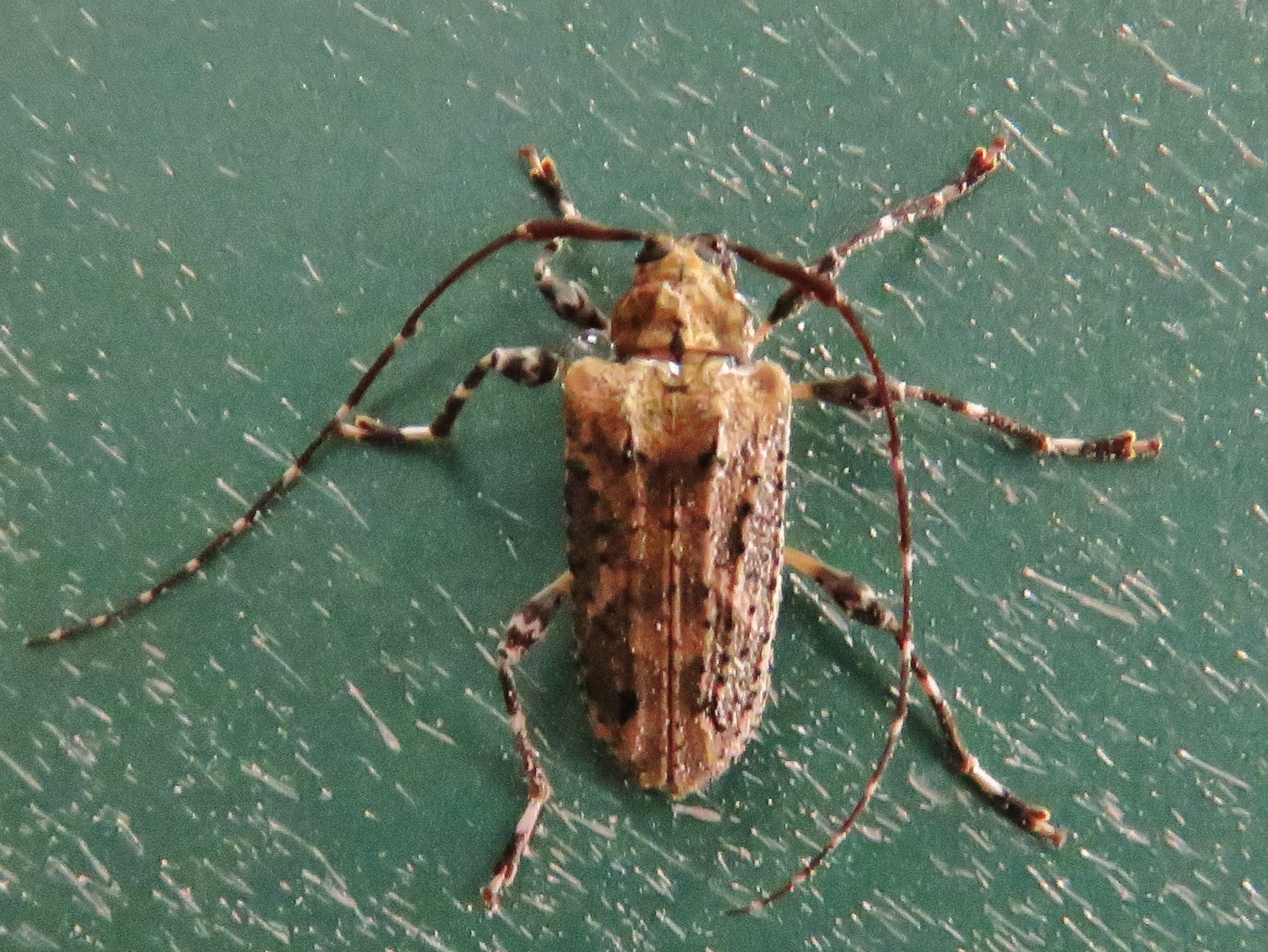

Scientific classification
- Kingdom: Animalia
- Phylum: Arthropoda
- Class: Insecta
- Order: Coleoptera
- Suborder: Polyphaga
- Infraorder: Cucujiformia
- Family: Cerambycidae
- Genus: Nealcidion
- Species: N. emeritum

Binomial name
- Nealcidion emeritum (Erichson, 1847)

= Nealcidion emeritum =

Nealcidion emeritum Temporal range: 0.000178–0 Ma

Species of beetle

Nealcidion emeritum is a species of beetle in the family Cerambycidae. It was described by Wilhelm Ferdinand Erichson in 1847.
