= Nealcidion sexguttatum =

Scientific classification
- Kingdom: Animalia
- Phylum: Arthropoda
- Class: Insecta
- Order: Coleoptera
- Suborder: Polyphaga
- Infraorder: Cucujiformia
- Family: Cerambycidae
- Genus: Nealcidion
- Species: N. sexguttatum

Binomial name
- Nealcidion sexguttatum Monné & Delfino, 1986

Species of beetle

Nealcidion sexguttatum is a species of beetle in the family Cerambycidae. It was described by Monné and Delfino in 1986.
