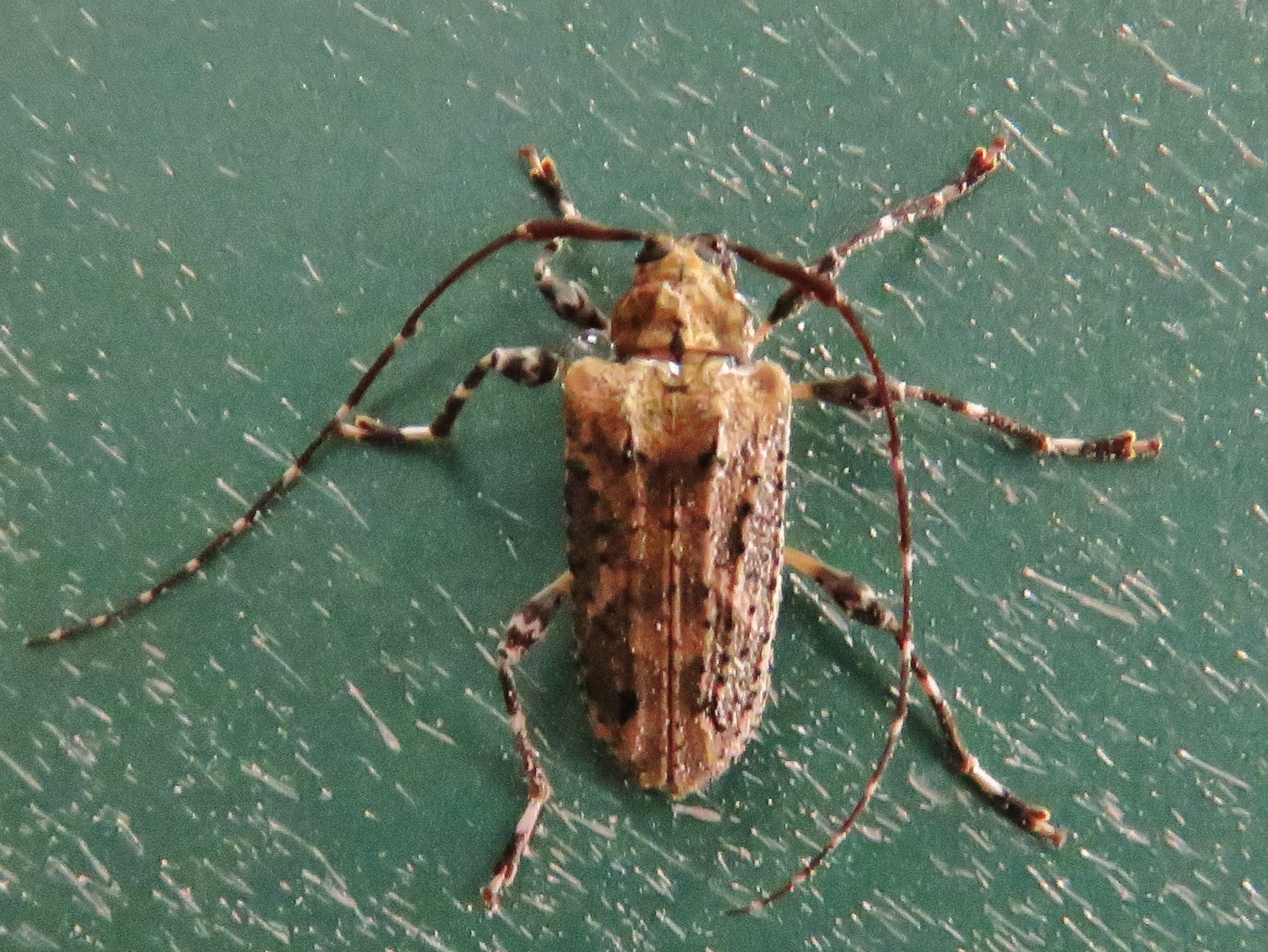
- Nealcidion emeritum

Scientific classification
- Kingdom: Animalia
- Phylum: Arthropoda
- Clade: Pancrustacea
- Class: Insecta
- Order: Coleoptera
- Suborder: Polyphaga
- Infraorder: Cucujiformia
- Family: Cerambycidae
- Tribe: Acanthocinini
- Genus: Nealcidion; Monné, 1977

Synonyms
- Alcidion Thomson, 1860

= Nealcidion =

Genus of beetles

Nealcidion is a genus of beetles in the family Cerambycidae, containing the following species:

- Nealcidion adjunctum (Thomson, 1865)
- Nealcidion albatum Monné & Delfino, 1986
- Nealcidion albolineatum Monne & Monne, 2009
- Nealcidion alboplagiatum (Martins & Monné, 1974)
- Nealcidion antennatum Monne & Monne, 2009
- Nealcidion armatum Monné & Delfino, 1986
- Nealcidion badium Monné & Delfino, 1986
- Nealcidion batesi (Kirsch, 1889)
- Nealcidion bicristatum (Bates, 1863)
- Nealcidion birai Ávila-Jimenez & Botero, 2026
- Nealcidion bispinum (Bates, 1863)
- Nealcidion brachiale (Bates, 1872)
- Nealcidion bruchi (Melzer, 1934)
- Nealcidion cereicola (Fisher, 1936)
- Nealcidion costatum (Monné & Martins, 1976)
- Nealcidion coxale (Kirsch, 1889)
- Nealcidion cristulatum Monné & Delfino, 1986
- Nealcidion cuspidatum Monné, 1998
- Nealcidion cyllenoide (Aurivillius, 1925)
- Nealcidion decoratum (Melzer, 1932)
- Nealcidion elegans Monne & Monne, 2009
- Nealcidion elongatum Monné, 1998
- Nealcidion emeritum (Erichson, 1847)
- Nealcidion eulophum (Bates, 1881)
- Nealcidion femoratum (Monné & Martins, 1976)
- Nealcidion formosum (Monné & Martins, 1976)
- Nealcidion furciferum (Bates, 1881)
- Nealcidion griseum (Aurivillius, 1900)
- Nealcidion humerosum (Bates, 1880)
- Nealcidion hylaeanum (Monné & Martins, 1976)
- Nealcidion interrogationis (Bates, 1863)
- Nealcidion laetulum (Bates, 1880)
- Nealcidion latipenne (Bates, 1863)
- Nealcidion latum (Thomson, 1860)
- Nealcidion lineatum (Bates, 1863)
- Nealcidion melasmum Monné & Delfino, 1986
- Nealcidion meridanum Monné & Delfino, 1986
- Nealcidion minimum (Bates, 1863)
- Nealcidion murinum Monné, 1998
- Nealcidion nebulosum (Bates, 1880)
- Nealcidion oculatum (Bates, 1863)
- Nealcidion omissum (Martins & Monné, 1974)
- Nealcidion parallelum (Monné & Martins, 1976)
- Nealcidion privatum (Pascoe, 1866)
- Nealcidion pulchrum (Bates, 1880)
- Nealcidion quinquemaculatum (Tippmann, 1960)
- Nealcidion santossilvai Ávila-Jimenez & Botero, 2026
- Nealcidion scutellatum (Bates, 1881)
- Nealcidion sexguttatum Monné & Delfino, 1986
- Nealcidion sexnotatum (Waterhouse, 1901)
- Nealcidion silvai Monné & Delfino, 1986
- Nealcidion simillimum (Melzer, 1932)
- Nealcidion singulare Monné, 1998
- Nealcidion socium (Gahan, 1895)
- Nealcidion spinosum Monné & Delfino, 1986
- Nealcidion strigilis (Erichson, 1847)
- Nealcidion triangulare (Bates, 1863)
- Nealcidion trivittatum (Bates, 1863)
- Nealcidion venosum (Bates, 1880)
