= Nealcidion nebulosum =

Scientific classification
- Kingdom: Animalia
- Phylum: Arthropoda
- Class: Insecta
- Order: Coleoptera
- Suborder: Polyphaga
- Infraorder: Cucujiformia
- Family: Cerambycidae
- Genus: Nealcidion
- Species: N. nebulosum

Binomial name
- Nealcidion nebulosum (Bates, 1880)

Species of beetle

Nealcidion nebulosum is a species of beetle in the family Cerambycidae. It was described by Bates in 1880.
