= Nealcidion antennatum =

Scientific classification
- Kingdom: Animalia
- Phylum: Arthropoda
- Class: Insecta
- Order: Coleoptera
- Suborder: Polyphaga
- Infraorder: Cucujiformia
- Family: Cerambycidae
- Genus: Nealcidion
- Species: N. antennatum

Binomial name
- Nealcidion antennatum Monne & Monne, 2009

Species of beetle

Nealcidion antennatum is a species of beetle in the family Cerambycidae. It was described by Monne and Monne in 2009. This species of beetle have only been found in Central and South America.
