= Nealcidion coxale =

Scientific classification
- Kingdom: Animalia
- Phylum: Arthropoda
- Class: Insecta
- Order: Coleoptera
- Suborder: Polyphaga
- Infraorder: Cucujiformia
- Family: Cerambycidae
- Genus: Nealcidion
- Species: N. coxale

Binomial name
- Nealcidion coxale (Kirsch, 1889)

Species of beetle

Nealcidion coxale is a species of beetle in the family Cerambycidae. It was described by Theodor Franz Wilhelm Kirsch in 1889.

Its body shows bilateral symmetry and shows holometabolous development.
