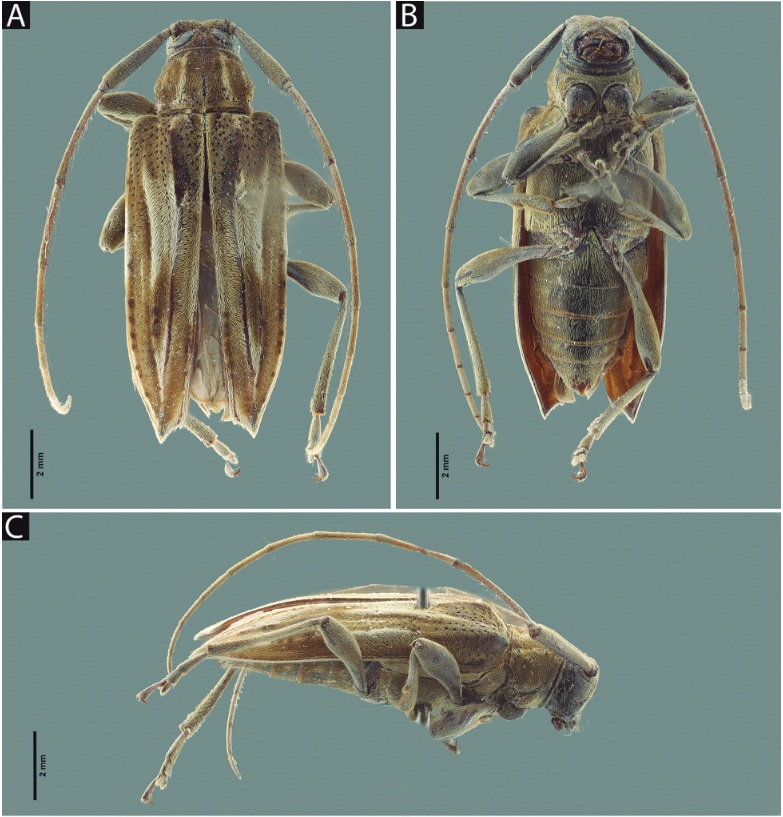

Scientific classification
- Kingdom: Animalia
- Phylum: Arthropoda
- Clade: Pancrustacea
- Class: Insecta
- Order: Coleoptera
- Suborder: Polyphaga
- Infraorder: Cucujiformia
- Family: Cerambycidae
- Genus: Nealcidion
- Species: N. birai

Binomial name
- Nealcidion birai Ávila-Jimenez & Botero, 2026

= Nealcidion birai =

Species of beetle

Nealcidion birai is a species of beetle of the family Cerambycidae. It is found in Colombia.

== Description ==
Adults reach a length of about 12 mm (0.47 in). The Integument is mostly dark brown, with the ventral mouthparts dark brown (except for the yellow apex of the maxillary palpomeres IV and labial palpomeres III). The anteclypeus is mostly yellowish brown close to postclypeus and laterally, with the central area close to the labrum dark.

== Etymology ==
The species is named in honour of Ubirajara R. Martins de Sousa, known as “Bira”, in recognition of his valuable contributions to the study of Neotropical Cerambycidae.
