= Nealcidion sexnotatum =

Scientific classification
- Kingdom: Animalia
- Phylum: Arthropoda
- Class: Insecta
- Order: Coleoptera
- Suborder: Polyphaga
- Infraorder: Cucujiformia
- Family: Cerambycidae
- Genus: Nealcidion
- Species: N. sexnotatum

Binomial name
- Nealcidion sexnotatum (Waterhouse, 1901)

Species of beetle

Nealcidion sexnotatum is a species of beetle in the family Cerambycidae. It was described by Waterhouse in 1901.
