= Nealcidion alboplagiatum =

Scientific classification
- Kingdom: Animalia
- Phylum: Arthropoda
- Class: Insecta
- Order: Coleoptera
- Suborder: Polyphaga
- Infraorder: Cucujiformia
- Family: Cerambycidae
- Genus: Nealcidion
- Species: N. alboplagiatum

Binomial name
- Nealcidion alboplagiatum (Martins & Monné, 1974)

Species of beetle

Nealcidion alboplagiatum is a species of longhorn beetle of the family Lamiinae. They are native to Espírito Santo, a state in Brazil in South America. It was described by Martins and Monné in 1974.
