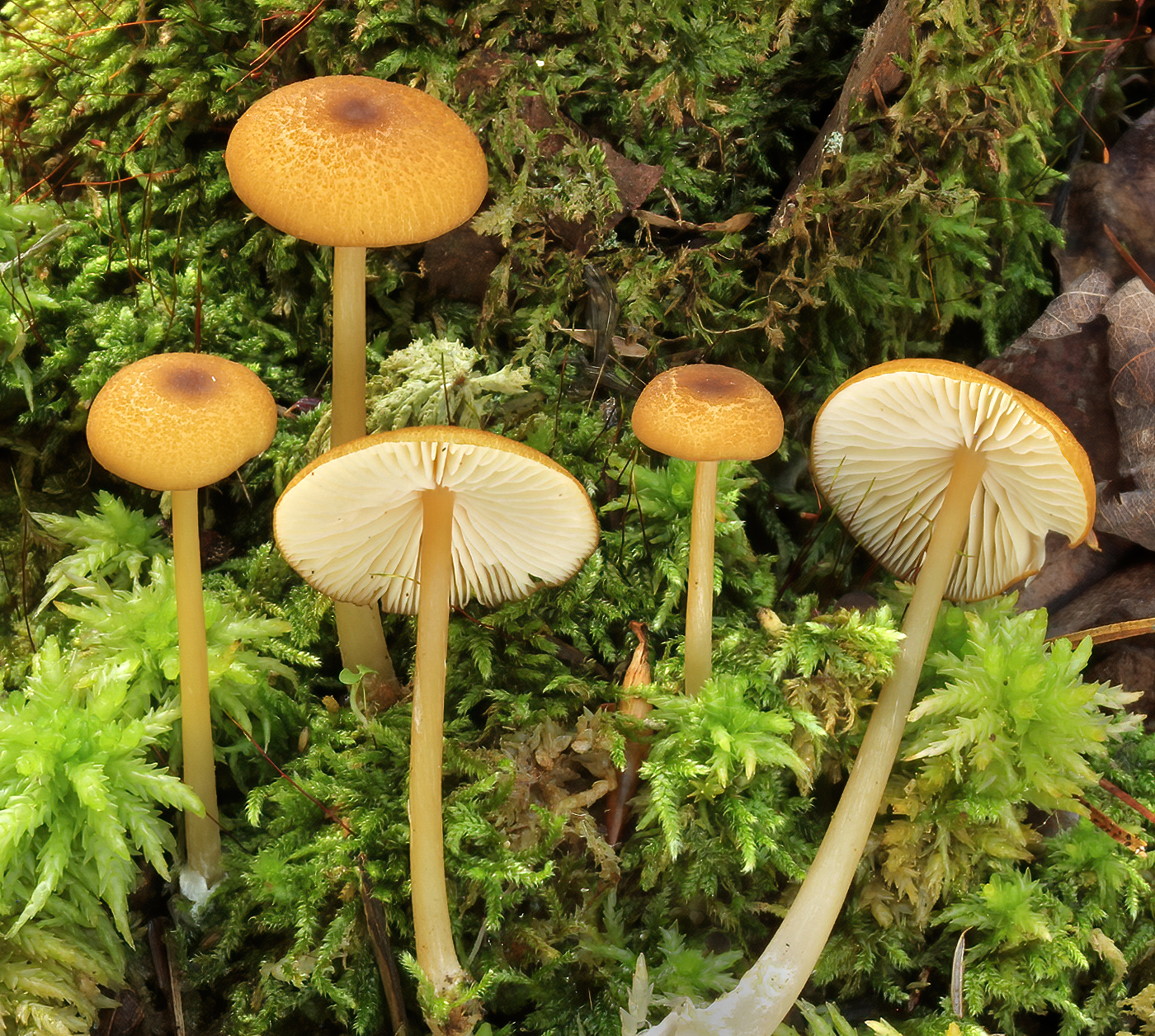

Scientific classification
- Kingdom: Fungi
- Division: Basidiomycota
- Class: Agaricomycetes
- Order: Agaricales
- Family: Entolomataceae
- Genus: Entoloma
- Species: E. formosum

Binomial name
- Entoloma formosum (Fr.) Noordel. (1985)

Synonyms
- Agaricus formosus Fr. (1821)

= Entoloma formosum =

Species of fungus

Entoloma formosum is an inconspicuous yellowish-brown mushroom in the family Entolomataceae.

== Description ==
E. formosum has a depressed yellowish-to-brownish cap ranging 1–5 centimetres (1/2–2 in) in width with darker radial lines. The stem is up to 10 cm (4 in) in height, and is buff with mycelium near the bottom. The gills are whitish when young, and become pinkish as the spores begin to color them. They can distinguished by their pink angular (or similar) spores, which produce a pink spore print.

Many Entoloma species are known to be quite difficult to identify, often requiring microscopic analysis or even DNA sequencing. There is a very similar lookalike called E. xanthocroum. It can be distinguished from E. formosum by its discolored gill edges and slightly larger spores.

== Habitat and ecology ==
Entoloma formosum is often found in disturbed areas such as trail sides, where it often grows under western redcedar. It is found in coniferous forests in the Pacific Northwest.

== See also ==
Entoloma formosum
- Mycological characteristics
- Gills on hymenium
- Cap is convex or flat
- Hymenium is adnexed
- Stipe is bare
- Spore print is salmon
- Edibility is unknown

- List of Entomola species
