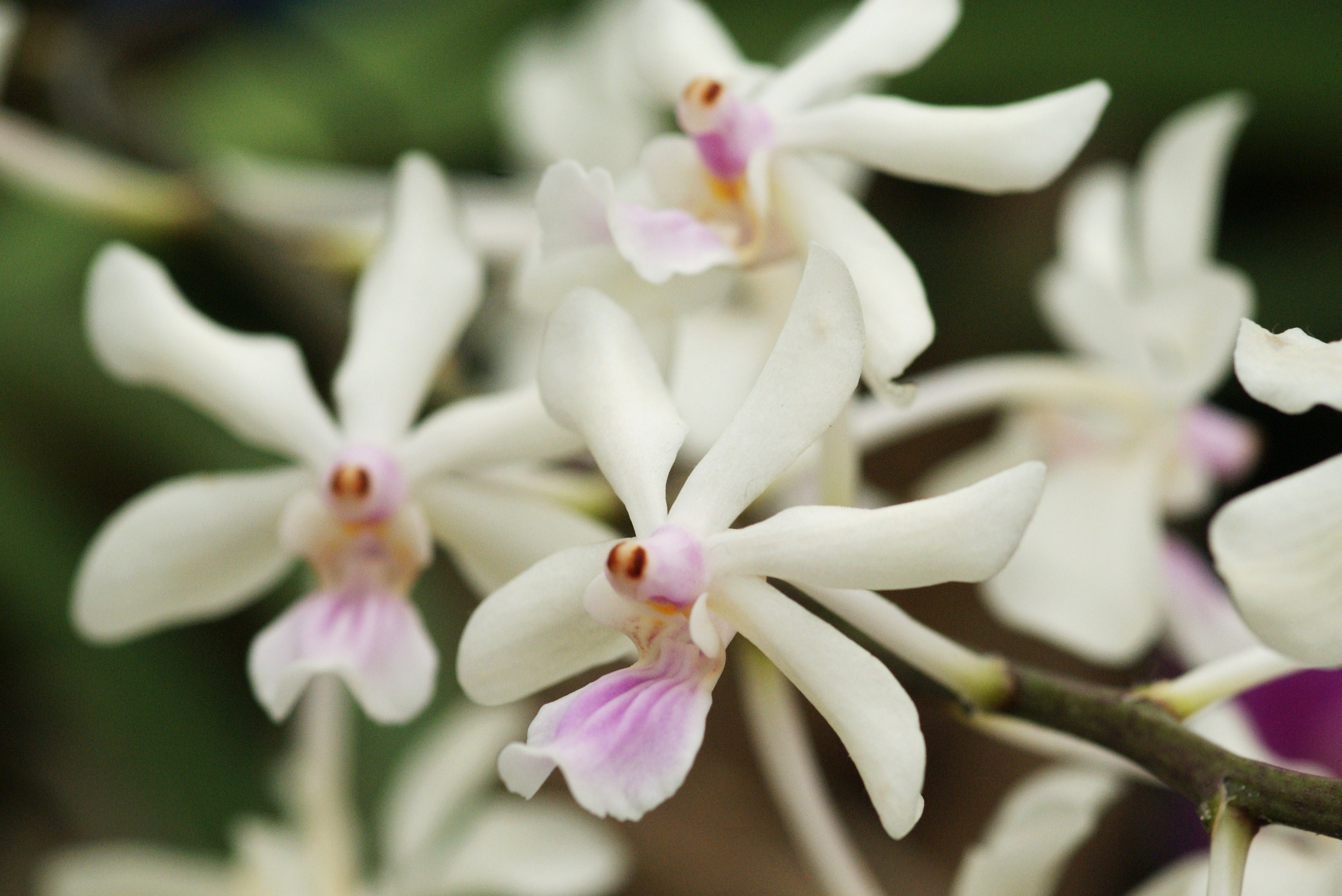
- Flowers

Scientific classification
- Kingdom: Plantae
- Clade: Tracheophytes
- Clade: Angiosperms
- Clade: Monocots
- Order: Asparagales
- Family: Orchidaceae
- Subfamily: Epidendroideae
- Genus: Holcoglossum
- Species: H. amesianum

Binomial name
- Holcoglossum amesianum (Rchb.f.) Christenson (1987)

Synonyms
- Vanda amesiana Rchb.f. (1887) basionym; Vanda amesiana var. alba B.S. Williams (1894); Holcoglossum amesianum f. album (B.S. Williams) Christenson (1993)

= Holcoglossum amesianum =

Species of orchid

Holcoglossum amesianum is an orchid species (Family Orchidaceae) in the genus Holcoglossum.

== Pollination ==
Rather than depending on insects or even the wind for pollination, scientists have discovered that Holcoglossum amesianum actually fertilizes itself. The orchid defies gravity to twist the male part of its flower into a nearly complete circle to fertilize the female one. Nothing like this occurs elsewhere among flowering plants.

The plant does so without the help of sticky fluids or other methods used by self-pollinating plants to ensure that the pollen reaches the egg. It grows on tree trunks in China's Yunnan province and flowers during the dry, windless months of February to April, making wind pollination highly improbable.

The orchid produces no scent or nectar. Instead, the pollen-bearing anther uncovers itself and rotates into a suitable position to insert into the stigma cavity, where fertilization takes place. This sexual relationship is so exclusive that flowers do not even transfer pollen to other flowers on the same plant.
