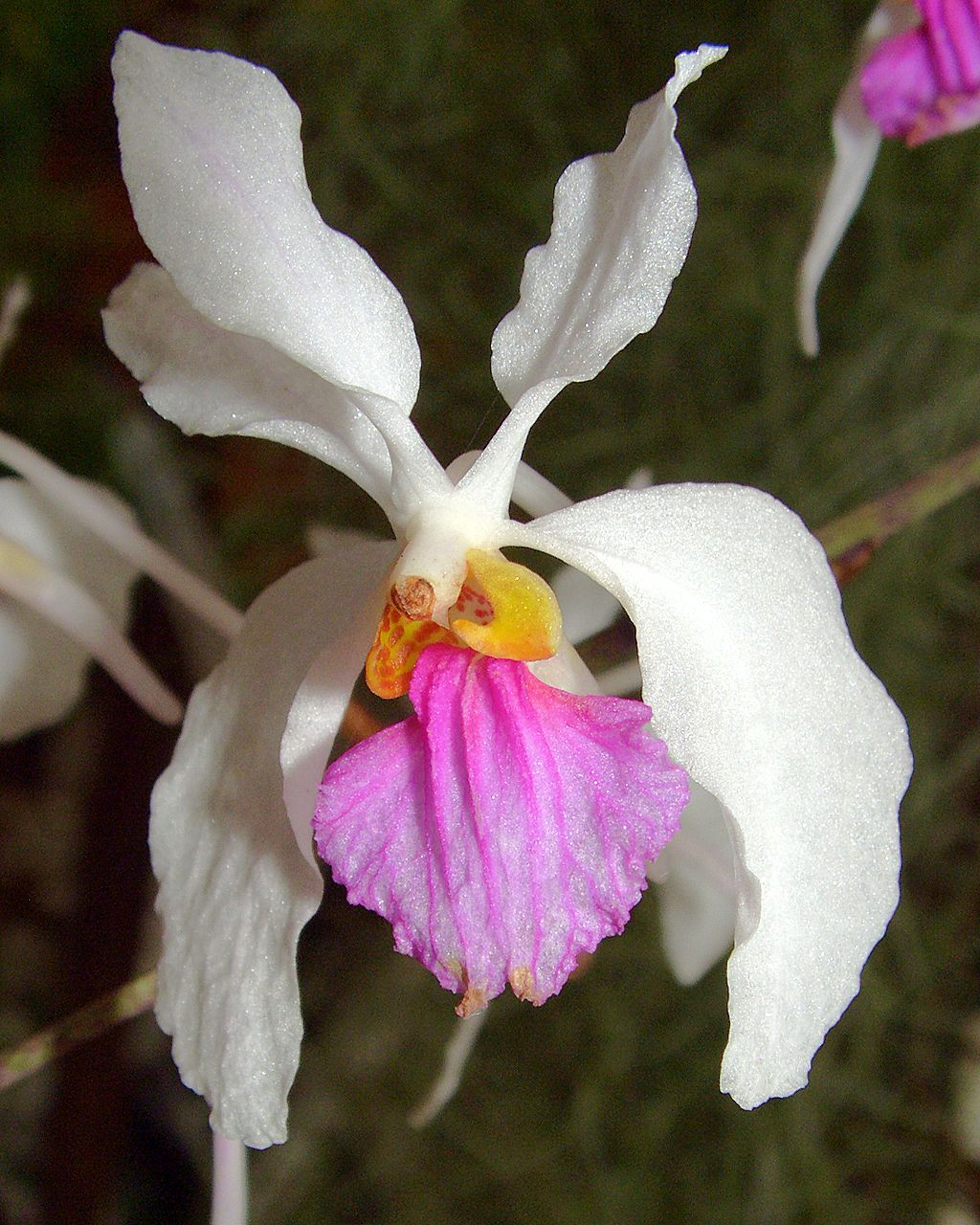
- Holcoglossum kimballianum

Scientific classification
- Kingdom: Plantae
- Clade: Tracheophytes
- Clade: Angiosperms
- Clade: Monocots
- Order: Asparagales
- Family: Orchidaceae
- Subfamily: Epidendroideae
- Tribe: Vandeae
- Subtribe: Aeridinae
- Genus: Holcoglossum; Schltr.

Type species
- Holcoglossum quasipinifolium

Synonyms
- Ascolabium S.S.Ying; Chenorchis Z.J.Liu, K.W.Liu & L.J.Chen; Paraholcoglossum Z.J.Liu, S.C.Chen & L.J.Chen; Pendulorchis Z.J.Liu, K.Wei Liu & G.Q.Zhang; Penkimia Phukan & Odyuo; Tsiorchis Z.J.Liu, S.C.Chen & L.J.Chen

= Holcoglossum =

Genus of orchids

Holcoglossum (Holc.) is a genus of orchids, in the family Orchidaceae. It is native from Assam through mainland China to Taiwan and Indo-China.

== Description ==
All species of this genus are perennial epi- or lithophytes and are characterized by a short monopodial shoot axis with terete or cross-sectionally triangular leaves. The upper side forms a groove with the folded edges of the leaves. The leaves are tapered and not notched at the leaf tip. The root tips of living roots show a reddish color in all species of the genus, and some species also have red-spotted foliage. The flowering stem emerges laterally from the shoot axis and forms two or more flowers, which are far apart and form a raceme or inflorescence.

The flowers are white and wide open. The lip is three-lobed. The lateral lobes are erect and dotted adaxially. The central part is spread out over a large area and is parallel to the gynostemium. The lip is shaped to allow potential pollinators to depress the middle lip. The flowers have an elongated spur, which is strongly reduced in the subgenus Brachycentron. The gynostemium has a large scar area. The stamen contains two separate pollina. The stipes connecting the pollina and the adhesive disc (Viscidium) bend in the middle when removed from the rostellum. The rostellum is deeply incised. The number of chromosomes is 2n = 38 in almost all species. Holcoglossum tsii has 76 chromosomes in the diploid chromosome set (2n = 76).

Self-pollination has been observed in Holcoglossum amesianum, in which the pollina moves independently to the fertile stigma in the column.

== Species ==
As of July 2024, Plants of the World Online accepted the following species:

Image	Name	Distribution	Elevation (m)
	Holcoglossum amesianum (Rchb.f.) Christenson, 1987	Yunnan, Assam, Myanmar, Vietnam, Thailand, Laos, Cambodia	1,200–1,600 metres (3,900–5,200 ft)
	Holcoglossum auriculatum Z.J.Liu, S.C.Chen & X.H.Jin, 2005	Yunnan, Myanmar, Vietnam, Thailand	
	Holcoglossum clausum K.P.Wojtas, C.Bandara & Kumar 2024	Myanmar	
	Holcoglossum calcicola Schuit. & P.Bonnet, 2009	Laos	
	Holcoglossum flavescens (Schltr.) Z.H.Tsi, 1982	Fujian, Hubei, Sichuan, Yunnan	1,200–2,000 metres (3,900–6,600 ft)
	Holcoglossum himalaicum (Deb, Sengupta & Malick) Aver. 1988	Yunnan, Myanmar	1,800–2,100 metres (5,900–6,900 ft)
	Holcoglossum kimballianum (Rchb.f.) Garay 1982	Yunnan, Myanmar, Vietnam, Thailand, Laos	1,200–1,800 metres (3,900–5,900 ft)
	Holcoglossum × kunmingense D.K.Zhao, Ze Zhang & Rui B.Wang 2022 (H. flavescens × H. tsii)	Yunnan	
	Holcoglossum lingulatum (Aver.) Aver. 1990	Guangxi, Yunnan, Vietnam	1,000–1,300 metres (3,300–4,300 ft)
	Holcoglossum linearifolium Z.J.Liu, S.C.Chen & L.J.Chen 2011	Yunnan	1,500–2,000 metres (4,900–6,600 ft)
	Holcoglossum nagalandense (Phukan & Odyuo) X.H.Jin 2012	Assam (Nagaland) to China (W. Yunnan) and Vietnam	1,600–2,000 metres (5,200–6,600 ft)
	Holcoglossum nujiangense X.H.Jin & S.C.Chen 2007 publ. 2008	Yunnan	2,500–3,000 metres (8,200–9,800 ft)
	Holcoglossum omeiense X.H.Jin & S.C.Chen 2005	Sichuan	700–1,000 metres (2,300–3,300 ft)
	Holcoglossum phongii (Aver.) Aver. & O.Gruss 2016	Vietnam	50–150 metres (160–490 ft)
	Holcoglossum pumilum (Hayata) L.J.Chen, X.J.Xiao & G.Q.Zhang 2013	Taiwan	1,000–2,300 metres (3,300–7,500 ft)
	Holcoglossum quasipinifolium (Hayata) Schltr. 1919	Taiwan	1,800–2,800 metres (5,900–9,200 ft)
	Holcoglossum rupestre (Hand.-Mazz.) Garay 1972	Yunnan	2,000–2,400 metres (6,600–7,900 ft)
	Holcoglossum semiteretifolium (Seidenf.) R.Rice 2018	Arunachal Pradesh to N. Thailand	
	Holcoglossum singchianum G.Q.Zhang, L.J.Chen & Z.J.Liu 2013	Yunnan	1,300–1,500 metres (4,300–4,900 ft)
	Holcoglossum sinicum Christenson 1987	Yunnan	2,600–3,200 metres (8,500–10,500 ft)
	Holcoglossum subulifolium (Rchb.f.) Christenson 1987	Hainan, Yunnan	1,000–2,200 metres (3,300–7,200 ft)
	Holcoglossum tsii T.Yukawa 2000	Sichuan, Yunnan	
	Holcoglossum wangii Christenson 1988	Yunnan, Guangxi, Vietnam	250–1,200 metres (820–3,940 ft)
	Holcoglossum watsonii (Rolfe) J.M.H.Shaw 2021	Vietnam	
	Holcoglossum weixiense X.H.Jin & S.C.Chen 2003	Yunnan	2,500–3,000 metres (8,200–9,800 ft)

== Distribution ==
The native distribution area of the genus is Assam, Bangladesh, East Himalaya, Tibet, south-central and south-east China, Hainan, Taiwan, Laos, Myanmar, Cambodia, Thailand, and Vietnam. Many of the species come from the Yunnan province in the south-west of the People's Republic of China. Holcoglossum quasipinifolium and Holcoglossum pumilum are endemic to Taiwan. The species live at higher altitudes between 1200 m and 3300 m and thus prefer a cool to cold habitat.

== Cultivation ==
The small species from this genus can be cultivated in small pots or baskets or tied to cork plates. Native of cool, damp woods, they require low temperatures and a light spot. In full sun, however, there is a risk of heat build-up. The plants often need water during the growth phase, and less frequent watering during the resting phase without letting them dry out. For a pot culture, the substrate should be quite fine in order to be able to nourish the tender roots.

The large species of the subgenus Brachycentron and section Holcoglossum can be cultivated in a tether but are best suited to basket or pot culture. An exception is Holcoglossum subulifolium, which is better tied up due to its hanging growth. If regular watering is ensured, these species are best cultivated in a basket without substrate. Any substrate used should be very coarse in texture to allow good air circulation at the roots. The plants need a very bright but also cool location. They should be watered regularly, with drier periods during dormancy. In the Meise Botanic Garden, Holcoglossum kimballianum are kept in an alpine greenhouse, where you have to condense your own breath and wear a parka. In nature, the plants are regularly exposed to hoarfrost during the flowering period, which they survive without any problems.

A successful culture often fails because the culture is permanently too warm or because the substrate is too fine, in which the roots die off due to the lack of air.

== Intergeneric hybrids ==
The following intergeneric hybrids with Holcoglossum are listed with the Royal Horticultural Society.

- ×Holcocentrum (Holcoglossum × Ascocentrum)
- ×Holcenda (Holcoglossum × Ascocentrum × Vanda)
- ×Holcosia (Holcoglossum × Luisia)
- ×Holcanthera (Holcoglossum × Renanthera)
- ×Holcodirea (Holcoglossum × Sedirea)
- ×Holcopsis (Holcoglossum × Vandopsis)
- ×Holcostylis (Holcoglossum × Rhynchostylis)
- ×Holcovanstylis (Holcoglossum × Rhynchostylis × Vanda)
- ×Mendelara (Holcoglossum × Ascocentrum × Neofinetia × Rhynchostylis × Vanda)
- ×Vandoglossum (Holcoglossum × Vanda)
