= Ilex kusanoi =

Scientific classification
- Kingdom: Plantae
- Clade: Tracheophytes
- Clade: Angiosperms
- Clade: Eudicots
- Clade: Asterids
- Order: Aquifoliales
- Family: Aquifoliaceae
- Genus: Ilex
- Species: I. kusanoi

Binomial name
- Ilex kusanoi Hayata

Synonyms
- Ilex poneantha Koidz.; Ilex taiwaniana Hayata

Species of plant

Ilex kusanoi is a species of flowering plant in the holly family Aquifoliaceae, native to Green Island and Orchid Island of Taiwan and Amami Ōshima of the Ryukyu Islands. It is a deciduous tree found growing from sea level up to 400 m (1,300 ft).
