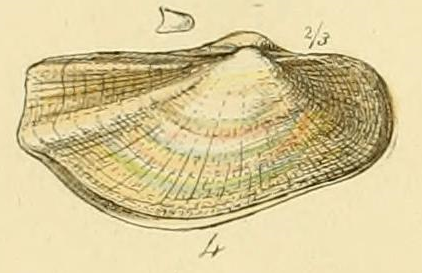
- Lyonsia norvegica

Scientific classification
- Kingdom: Animalia
- Phylum: Mollusca
- Class: Bivalvia
- Superorder: Anomalodesmata
- Superfamily: Pandoroidea
- Family: Lyonsiidae; Fischer, 1887

Genera
- See text.

= Lyonsiidae =

Family of bivalves

Lyonsiidae is a family of small saltwater clams, marine bivalve molluscs in the order Anomalodesmata.

== Description ==
Members of this family have inequivalve, oblong valves that are nearly equilateral. The right valve is more convex than the left, and there are usually no teeth. The ligament connecting the two valves is in an internal groove, and the hinge has a free ossicle.

== Genera and species ==
The World Register of Marine Species lists the following genera and species in the family:

- Allogramma Dall, 1903
  - Allogramma elegans (Thiele & Jaeckel, 1931)
  - Allogramma formosa (Jeffreys, 1882)
  - Allogramma oahuense (Dall, 1913)
- Bentholyonsia Habe, 1952
  - Bentholyonsia teramachii (Habe, 1952)
- Entodesma Phillips, 1845
  - Entodesma beana (d'Orbigny, 1853)
  - Entodesma brasiliense (Gould, 1850)
  - Entodesma brevifrons (G.B. Sowerby I, 1834)
  - Entodesma cuneata (Gray, 1828)
  - Entodesma delicatum (Marincovich, 1973)
  - Entodesma elongatulum Soot-Ryen, 1957
  - Entodesma fretalis (Dall, 1915)
  - Entodesma lucasana (Bartsch & Rehder, 1939)
  - Entodesma navicula (A. Adams and Reeve, 1850)
  - Entodesma patagonicum (d'Orbigny, 1846)
  - Entodesma pictum (G. B. Sowerby I, 1834)
  - Entodesma saxicola (Baird, 1863)
  - Entodesma sechuranum Pilsbry & Olsson, 1935
  - Entodesma solemyalis (Lamarck, 1818)
  - Entodesma weisbordi Macsotay & Campos, 2001
- Lyonsia Turton, 1822
  - Lyonsia adriatica
  - Lyonsia alvarezii d'Orbigny, 1846
  - Lyonsia arcaeforme Martens, 1885
  - Lyonsia arenosa (Moller, 1842)
  - Lyonsia argentea Jeffreys, 1881
  - Lyonsia bracteata (Gould, 1850)
  - Lyonsia californica Conrad, 1837
  - Lyonsia cucumerina Ivanova in Scarlato, 1981
  - Lyonsia floridana Conrad, 1849
  - Lyonsia granulifera A. E. Verrill and Bush, 1898
  - Lyonsia hyalina Conrad, 1831
  - Lyonsia kawamurai Habe, 1952
  - Lyonsia malvinensis d'Orbigny, 1846
  - Lyonsia norvegica (J.F. Gmelin, 1791)
  - Lyonsia nuculaniformis Scarlato, 1981
  - Lyonsia panamensis Dall, 1908
  - Lyonsia praetenuis Dunker, 1882
  - Lyonsia shimkevitch (M. Sars, 1868)
  - Lyonsia striata (Montagu, 1815)
  - Lyonsia taiwanica Lan & Okutani, 2002
  - Lyonsia ventricosa Gould, 1861
  - Lyonsia vniroi Scarlato, 1981
