= Dorcadion formosum =

Scientific classification
- Kingdom: Animalia
- Phylum: Arthropoda
- Clade: Pancrustacea
- Class: Insecta
- Order: Coleoptera
- Suborder: Polyphaga
- Infraorder: Cucujiformia
- Family: Cerambycidae
- Genus: Dorcadion
- Species: D. formosum

Binomial name
- Dorcadion formosum Kraatz, 1870

Synonyms
- Dorcadion formosum ponticum Breuning, 1964

Species of beetle

Dorcadion formosum is a species of beetle in the family Cerambycidae. It was described by Kraatz in 1870. It is known from Turkey.
