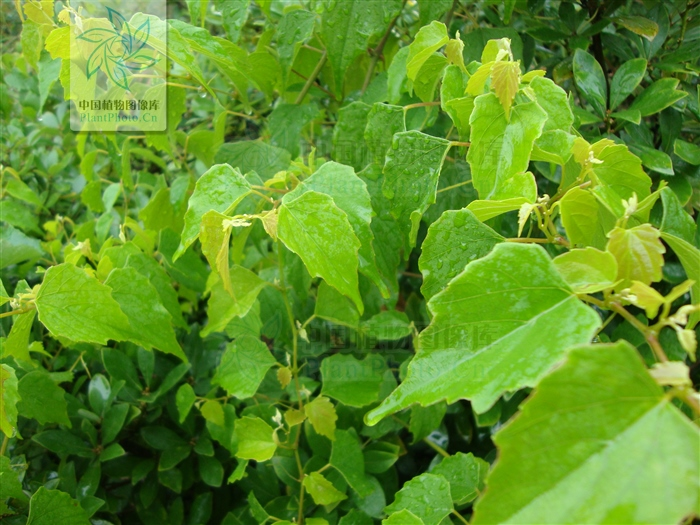
- Lobular grape observed in Fujian Province

Scientific classification
- Kingdom: Plantae
- Clade: Tracheophytes
- Clade: Angiosperms
- Clade: Eudicots
- Clade: Rosids
- Order: Vitales
- Family: Vitaceae
- Genus: Vitis
- Species: V. sinocinerea

Binomial name
- Vitis sinocinerea W.T.Wang

Synonyms
- V. thunbergii var. cinerea Gagnep. V. thunbergii var. taiwaniana F.Y.Lu

= Vitis sinocinerea =

Species of grapevine

Vitis sinocinerea, commonly known as the lobular grape or small-leaved grape (Chinese: 小葉葡萄; pinyin: xiǎo yè pú táo; lit. 'small-leaved grape'), Its natural habitat is within forested or shrubby hills (200–2800 m. elev.).

Vitis sinocinerea flowers in May and June, bearing fruit from July to October. It has calyptrate flower petals and the pistils are non-functional in male flowers. Its berries are usually 6–0 mm. in diameter, and darkly purple to black.

A holotype specimen was first collected of this species by E. H. Wilson from Xingshan Xian, in Hubei province, China in June 1907, who said it was 'climbing or prostrate over rocks, 600–1200 m.' Its characteristics were later (1911) described by François Gagnepain, and given the name of cinerea, a variety of V. thunbergii.
