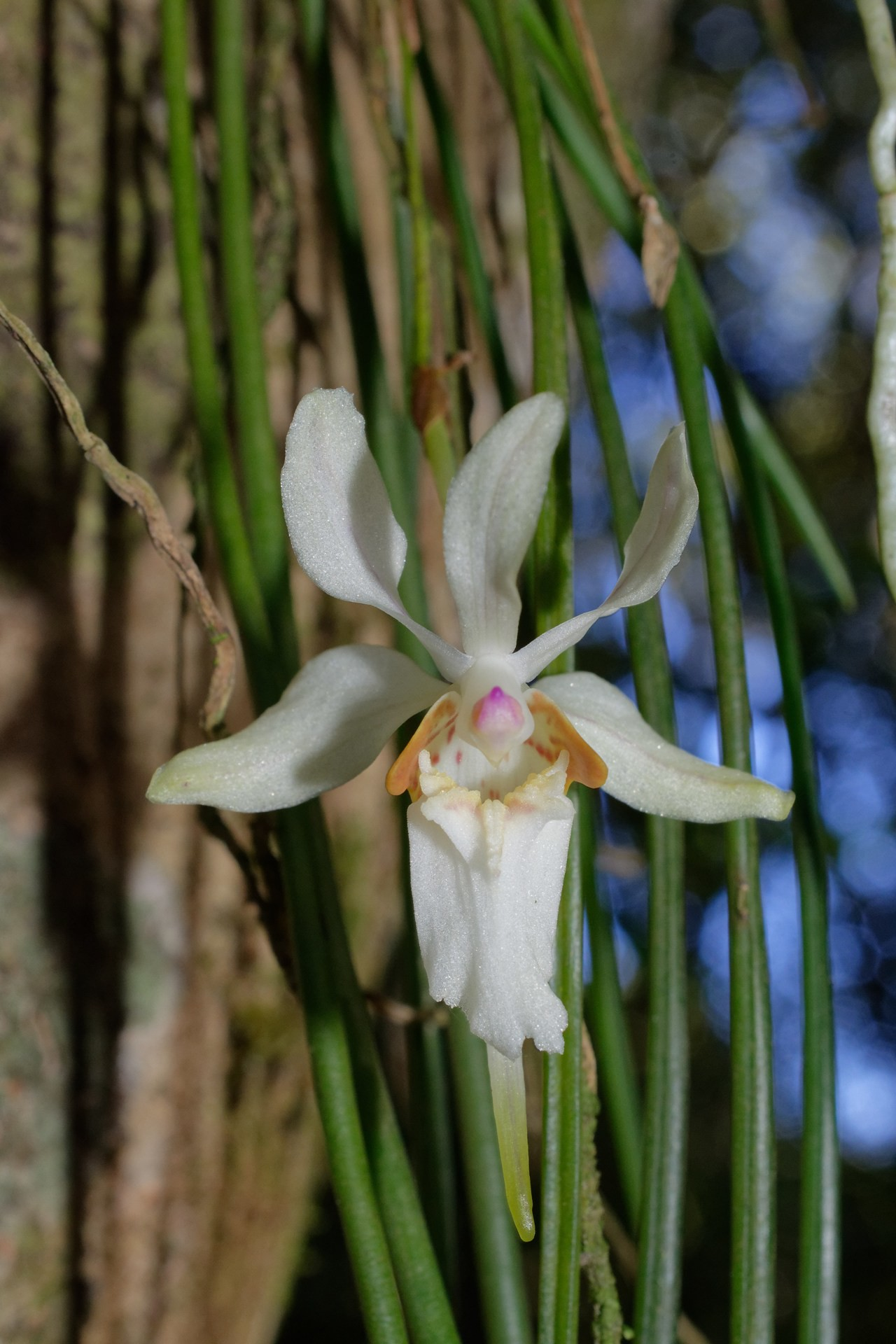

Conservation status
- Endangered (IUCN 3.1)

Scientific classification
- Kingdom: Plantae
- Clade: Tracheophytes
- Clade: Angiosperms
- Clade: Monocots
- Order: Asparagales
- Family: Orchidaceae
- Subfamily: Epidendroideae
- Genus: Holcoglossum
- Species: H. quasipinifolium

Binomial name
- Holcoglossum quasipinifolium (Hayata) Schltr.

Synonyms
- Gastrochilus quasipinifolius (Hayata) Hayata; Saccolabium quasipinifolium Hayata

= Holcoglossum quasipinifolium =

Species of orchid

Holcoglossum quasipinifolium is a species of flowering plant in the family Orchidaceae. It is epiphytic subshrub endemic to Taiwan.
