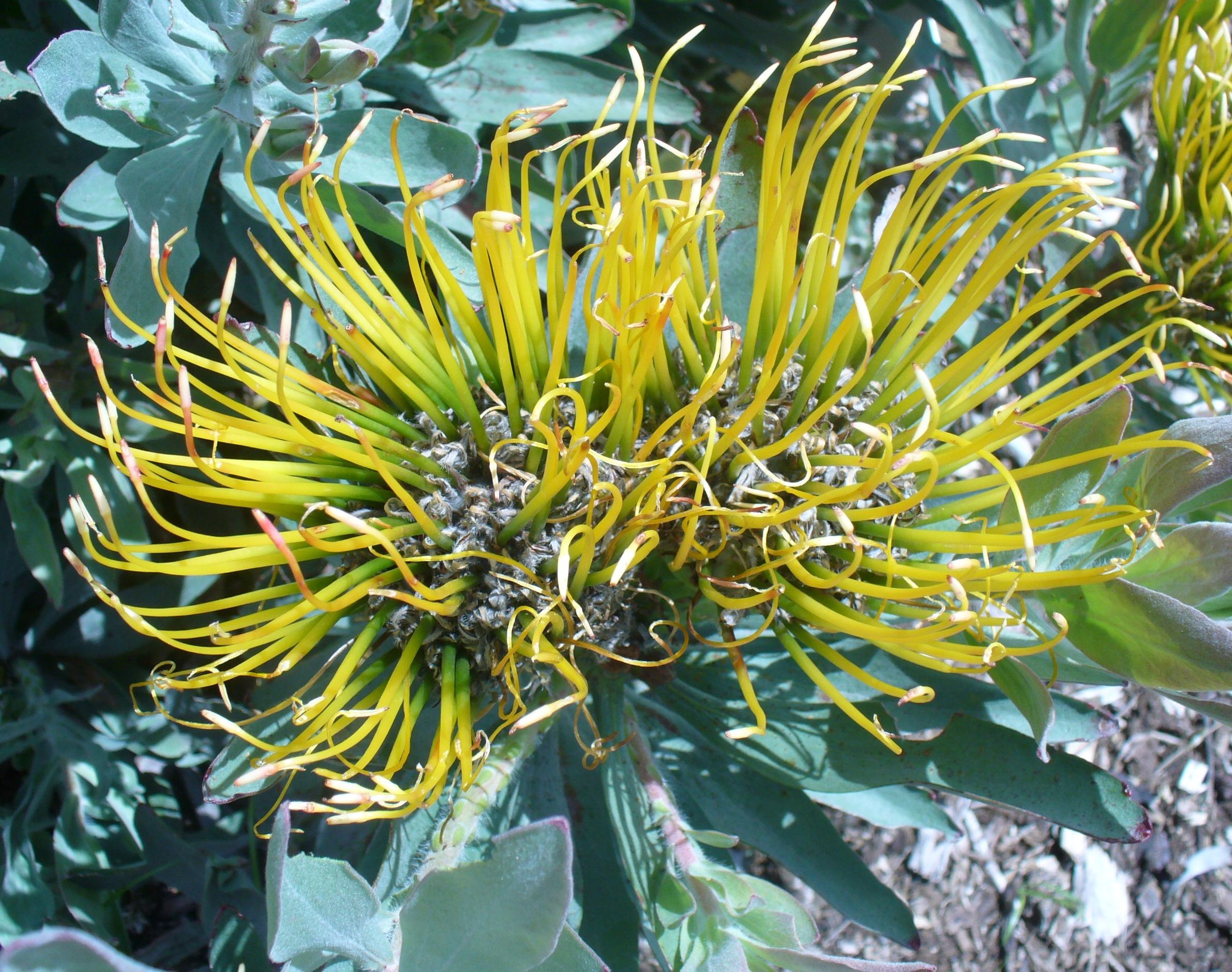

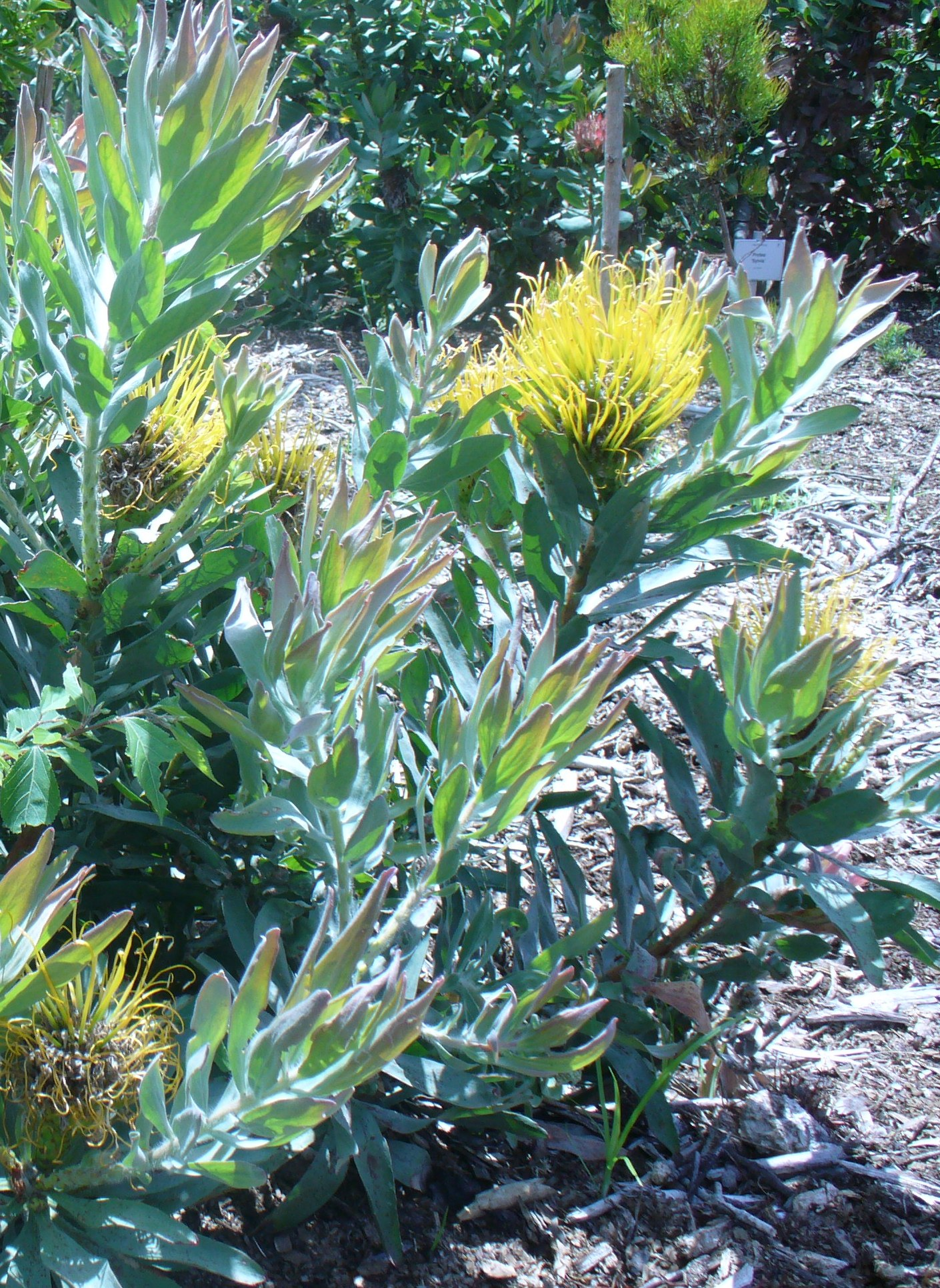

Conservation status
- Endangered (IUCN 3.1)

Scientific classification
- Kingdom: Plantae
- Clade: Tracheophytes
- Clade: Angiosperms
- Clade: Eudicots
- Order: Proteales
- Family: Proteaceae
- Genus: Leucospermum
- Species: L. formosum

Binomial name
- Leucospermum formosum (Andrews) Sweet

Synonyms
- Protea formosa Andrews, 1798, non Leucospermum formosum (Salisb. ex Knight) Loud., 1829, Leucadendrum formosum, Leucodendron formosum

= Leucospermum formosum =

Species of plant native to South Africa

Leucospermum formosum is a large upright shrub of up to 3 m (9.8 ft) high, from the family Proteaceae. It grows from a single trunk and its branches are greyish felty. The softly felty leaves are lance-shaped to elliptic, 6 1/2–10 cm (2.6–3.9 in) long and 14–20 mm (0.55–0.79 in) wide. The flower heads are flattened and about 15 cm (5.9 in) across, and consist of bright yellow flowers from which long, styles emerge which are strongly clockwise bent just below the white, later pink thickened tip. From above, the heads look like turning wheels. It is called silver-leaf wheel-pincushion in English. It flowers during September and October. It is an endemic species of the Western Cape province of South Africa.

== Description ==
The Leucospermum formosum is a large upright shrub of up to 3 m (9.8 ft) high, growing from a single main trunk. The flowering branches are upright, up to 8 mm (0.31 in) thick, and are covered by both short, fine, dense cringy hairs interspersed with long upright hairs of 5–7 mm (0.20–0.28 in) long. The softly felty leaves are lance-shaped to elliptic, 6 1/2–10 cm (2.6–3.9 in) long and 14–20 mm (0.55–0.79 in) wide, seated or nearly so, set alternately at an upward angle and somewhat overlapping, in leaves of young plants entire, but later mostly with three deep teeth near the tip.

The flower heads are disc-shaped, about 15 cm (5.9 in) in diameter, set on a stalk of 1–2 cm (0.39–0.79 in) long, are mostly set individually, but sometimes clustered with two or three together. When the flowers open, the styles grow rapidly, first breaking through the perianth claws and curve away from the center of the head, until the pollen presenter also ruptures the limbs at the top of the perianth. The common base has a pointy, narrow cone-shape, is 5–5 1/2 cm (2.0–2.2 in) long and 1–1 1/2 cm (0.39–0.59 in) across. The bracts subtending the flower head are pointy oval in shape, 1–1 1/2 cm (0.39–0.59 in) long and about 7 mm (0.28 in) wide, tightly pressed against the common base and overlapping, thin and papery imbricate, the outer surface initially covered in powdery hairs that soon wear off, and with a regular row of equal length hairs along its edge.

The bract subtending the individual flower is pointy to pointed lance-shaped, enveloping the perianth at its foot, with the margins folded inwards, about 2 cm (0.79 in) long and 8–10 mm (0.31–0.39 in) wide, thickly covered in woolly hairs at its foot, with a regular row of equal length hairs along the edges and a tuft of tough straight hairs at the tip. The 4-merous perianth is about 5 cm (2.0 in) and golden yellow in colour. The lower part, that remains merged when the flower is open, is about 1 cm (0.39 in) long, somewhat compressed sideways, hairless at its foot and slightly powdery higher up. The middle part (or claws), are threat-shaped at their base but somewhat broadening higher up, with long hairs on the outer surface, all strongly curled back after the flower opens. The upper part (or limbs), which enclosed the pollen presenter in the bud, are very narrowly lance-shaped with a pointy tip, each about 7 mm long and 1 mm wide, set with many long soft hair, more or less forming a tuft at the tip. From the centre of the perianth emerges a slender, tapering, initially pale yellow, later amber to bronze coloured style of 7–8 cm (2.8–3.1 in) long, twisted clockwise near the tip. The thickened part at the tip of the style called pollen presenter is initially white, turning pink with age, narrowly cylinder-shaped with a pointy tip, about 7 mm (0.28 in) long, knicked at its base, curved clockwise at about a right angle with the style, with the groove that functions as the stigma across the very tip. The ovary is subtended by four awl-shaped scales of about 3 mm (0.12 in) long.

== Taxonomy ==
During November 1773, Francis Masson and Carl Peter Thunberg passed through the Langeberg Range via the Attaquas Kloof, between Mosselbay and Oudtshoorn. Here, they presumably collected ripe seeds on the southern slopes, near the current Ruitersbos Forest Reserve. The first validly published description of the silver-leaf wheel-pincushion, was based on material grown from Masson's seeds by Lee and Kennedy. This description was accompanied by a colour plate, that nicely shows its diagnostic characters. It was made by Henry Cranke Andrews in 1798, who called it Protea formosa. Specimens from Ruitersbos (near the Attaquas Kloof) closely match Andrews' illustration, although the downy lance-shaped leaves are characteristic for young plants that flower for the first time (older plants mostly have leaves with three teeth). In 1809, Richard Anthony Salisbury, who studied living plants in his garden at Chapel Allerton, Yorkshire, where the species had flowered and even produces ripe seeds, assigned it to his genus Leucadendrum. His contemporary, Robert Brown, considerably complicated the nomenclature by citing Protea formosa Andrews as a synonym of his own name Leucospermum medium (now Leucospermum vestitum), while newly describing at the same time an additional species, Protea formosa R.Br.. So the name Protea formosa, is not only a later homonym of the name Andrews coined, but also a later synonym to his own Protea compacta. Later authors stuck to Brown's name, even though there is little resemblance between Andrews' P. formosa and Brown's L. medium. Robert Sweet combined Andrews' species name with Brown's genus Leucospermum in 1818. In 1891, Otto Kuntze assigned the species to his wider delineation of the genus Leucadendron, creating the new combination Leucadendron formosum.

Leucospermum formosum is the type species of the fireworks pincushions, section Cardinistyle.

The species name formosum is Latin and means "beautiful" or "finely formed".

== Distribution, habitat and ecology ==
L. formosum is only known from a few scattered populations on southern slopes of the Riviersonderend Mountains, Langeberg and Outeniqua Mountains between the Duwelskop near George and the Dassieshoek Peak near Robertson. The most viable population can be found at Ruitersbos. No plants seem to remain at Garcia's Pass, where "the Prince of Collectors", Ernest Edward Galpin found the species in 1897. The species is restricted to cool conditions on moist peaty soils, at an altitude of 60–900 m (200–2,950 ft), with a mean annual precipitation of 635–1,015 mm (25.0–40.0 in), evenly distributed over the year. It grows in a tall dense sclerophyll vegetation that further is dominated by Erica species, Restionaceae and other Proteaceae.

The flower heads are visited by nectar-feeding Cape sugarbirds and several species of sunbird. Because the length of the bill of the Cape sugarbird equals that of the style, it is probably the more effective pollinator. The birds sit on the flower head and delve into the perianths in search of nectar, at the same time powdering their heads and breasts with pollen from the pollen presenters, and later rubbing it off on the stigmas at the very tips of the styles. Bees and beetles also visit the flower heads but do not touch the pollen presenters and so do not pollinate. The seeds are covered by a fleshy coating that attracts ants, that is called elaiosome. The seeds fall about two months after flowering to the ground, where native ant species carry them to their nests, and the elaiosome is eaten. The remaining seed is smooth and hard and too big for the ants jaws to remove, and so remain safe from being eaten by rodents and birds and overhead fires. Adult plants are killed by the fire but the seeds respond to increased daily temperature fluctuations and chemicals washed down from the char and germinate, so reviving the species at that location.

== Conservation ==
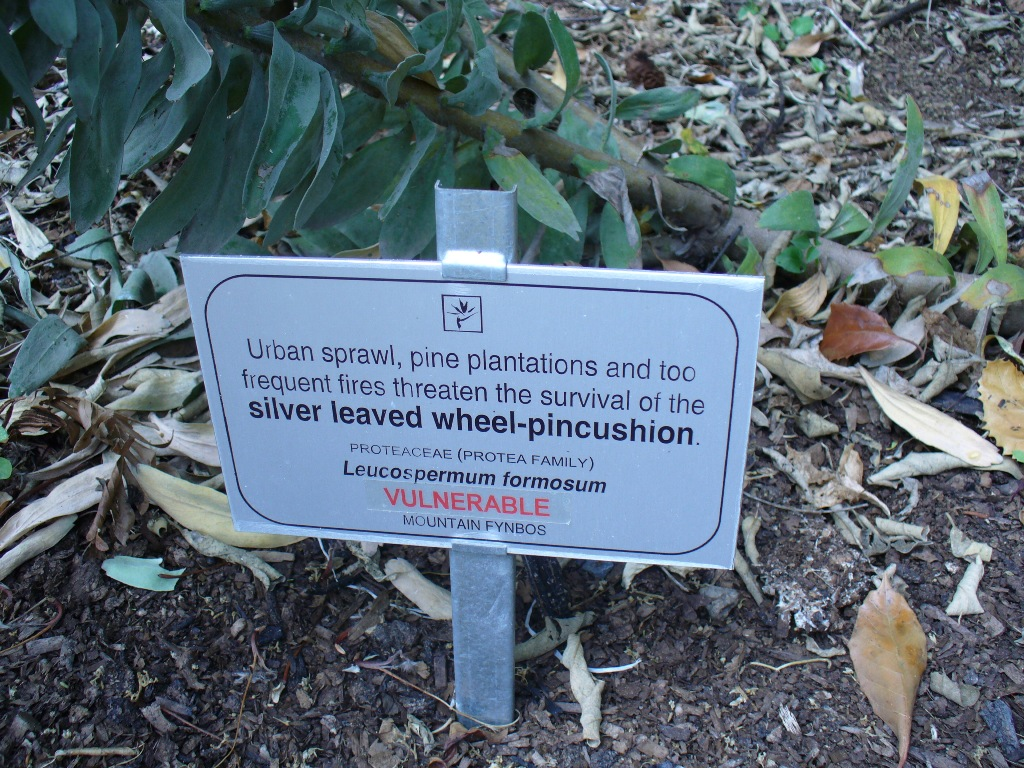
Information sign at Kirstenbosch National Botanical Garden

The silver-leaf wheel-pincushion is considered an endangered species because it grows in an area of only 57 km^{2} (22 sq mi), and half of the six previously known populations appear to have been lost. Losses are due to urban sprawl, afforestation, wild flower harvesting and competition by alien plant species.
