= Lyonsia taiwanica =

Scientific classification
- Domain: Eukaryota
- Kingdom: Animalia
- Phylum: Mollusca
- Class: Bivalvia
- Family: Lyonsiidae
- Genus: Lyonsia
- Species: L. taiwanica

Binomial name
- Lyonsia taiwanica Lan & Okutani, 2002

Species of bivalve

Lyonsia taiwanica is a bivalve within the family Lyonsiidae.

Lyonsia taiwanica was described by Lan and Okutani in 2002, from a sample near Tainan. It lives in mangroves.
