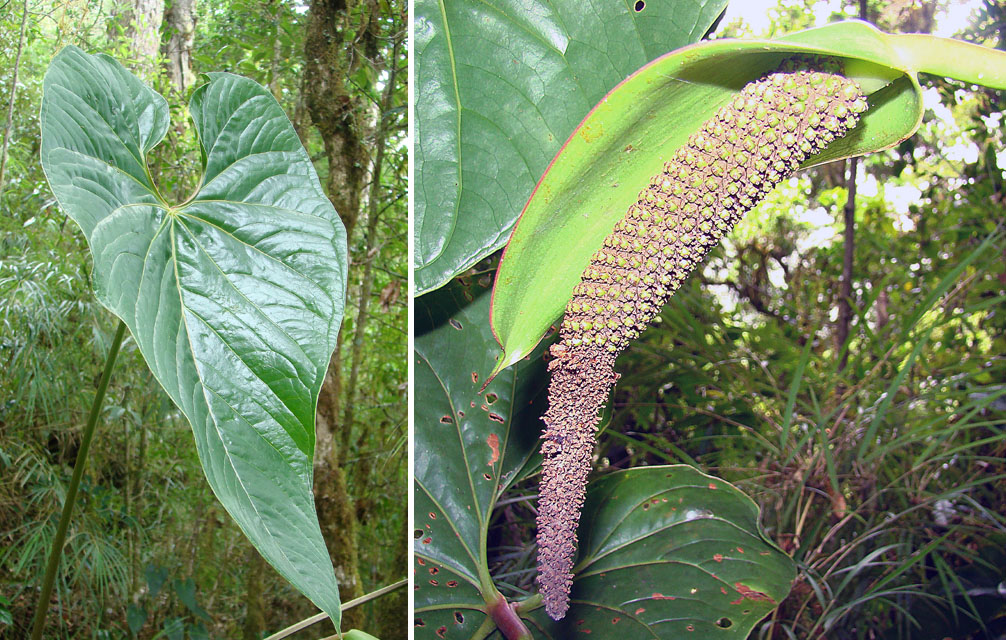

Scientific classification
- Kingdom: Plantae
- Clade: Tracheophytes
- Clade: Angiosperms
- Clade: Monocots
- Order: Alismatales
- Family: Araceae
- Genus: Anthurium
- Species: A. formosum

Binomial name
- Anthurium formosum Schott

= Anthurium formosum =

Species of plant

Anthurium formosum is a species of plant in the genus Anthurium native to Central and South America. Epiphytic or terrestrial, it is found from Nicaragua to Colombia and northwest Venezuela.

It is often one of the more common species at middle elevations of its habitat around 500–1,500 metres (1,600–4,900 ft), and may form large stands. It has relatively large leaves that may be 30–80 centimetres (12–31 in) long and 20–52 centimetres (7.9–20.5 in) wide. Its spadix is coated with a wax smelling of spearmint, which attracts euglossine bees.
