= Taiwana =

Taiwana may refer to the following species:

- Forcipomyia taiwana
- Chlorodontopera taiwana
- Eilema taiwana
- Lobogonodes taiwana
- Oberea taiwana
- Akkaia taiwana
- Neocalyptis taiwana
- Eterusia taiwana
- Autosticha taiwana
- Speidelia taiwana
- Euproctis taiwana
- Maladera taiwana
- Rhynchaglaea taiwana
- Episparis taiwana
- Zeiraphera taiwana
- Apamea taiwana
- Chandata taiwana
- Lophophelma taiwana
- Electrophaes taiwana
- Eupithecia taiwana
- Acleris taiwana
- Hypena taiwana
- Sewa taiwana
- Martania taiwana
- Menophra taiwana
- Dichomeris taiwana
- Dahira taiwana
- Orania taiwana
- Somatochlora taiwana
- Glipostenoda taiwana
- Ourapteryx taiwana
- Tolidostena taiwana
- Birthana taiwana
- Glyphipterix taiwana
- Dactylispa taiwana
- Agrotis taiwana
- Dindica taiwana
- Karenkonia taiwana

== See also ==
- Taiwania
- Taiwanica
- Taiwaniana
