= Chlorodontopera mandarinata =

Scientific classification
- Domain: Eukaryota
- Kingdom: Animalia
- Phylum: Arthropoda
- Class: Insecta
- Order: Lepidoptera
- Family: Geometridae
- Genus: Chlorodontopera
- Species: C. mandarinata

Binomial name
- Chlorodontopera mandarinata Leech (1889)

Species of moth

Chlorodontopera mandarinata is a species of moth in the genus Chlorodontopera.

== Description ==
It was described by John Henry Leech as being visually similar to Chlorodontopera chalybeata, but with a more strongly toothed and darker shaded hindwing than other Chlorodontopera.
