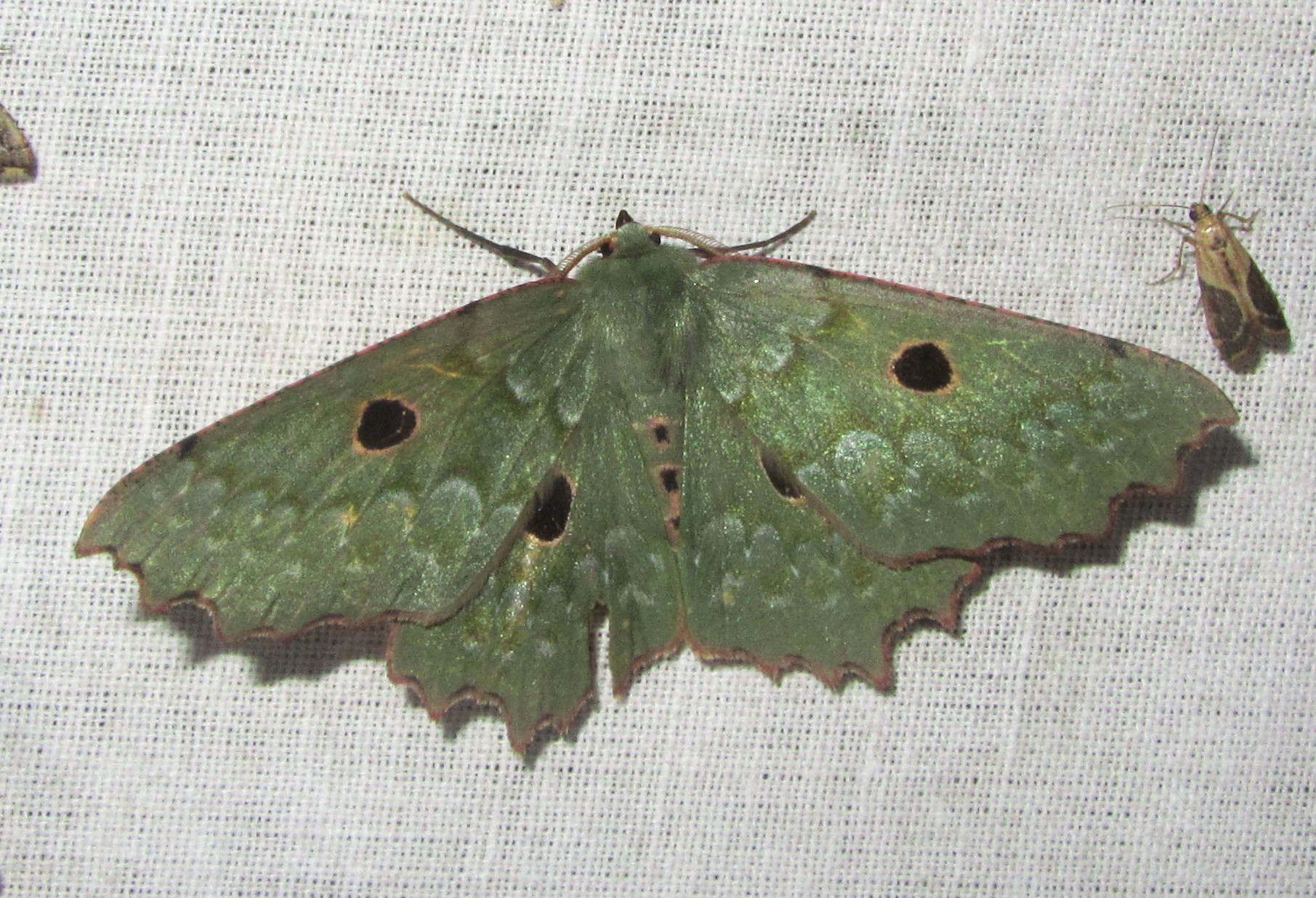
- Chlorodontopera discospilata

Scientific classification
- Kingdom: Animalia
- Phylum: Arthropoda
- Class: Insecta
- Order: Lepidoptera
- Family: Geometridae
- Subfamily: Geometrinae
- Genus: Chlorodontopera; Warren, 1893

= Chlorodontopera =

Genus of moths

Chlorodontopera is a moth genus in the family Geometridae described by William Warren in 1893.

== Species ==
There are four species recognized in this genus:

- Chlorodontopera chalybeata (Moore, 1872)
- Chlorodontopera discospilata (Moore, 1868)
- Chlorodontopera mandarinata (Leech, 1889)
- Chlorodontopera taiwana (Wileman, 1911)
