= Neocalyptis aperta =

Scientific classification
- Domain: Eukaryota
- Kingdom: Animalia
- Phylum: Arthropoda
- Class: Insecta
- Order: Lepidoptera
- Family: Tortricidae
- Genus: Neocalyptis
- Species: N. aperta

Binomial name
- Neocalyptis aperta Diakonoff, 1952

Species of moth

Neocalyptis aperta is a species of moth of the family Tortricidae. It is found in India and Myanmar.
