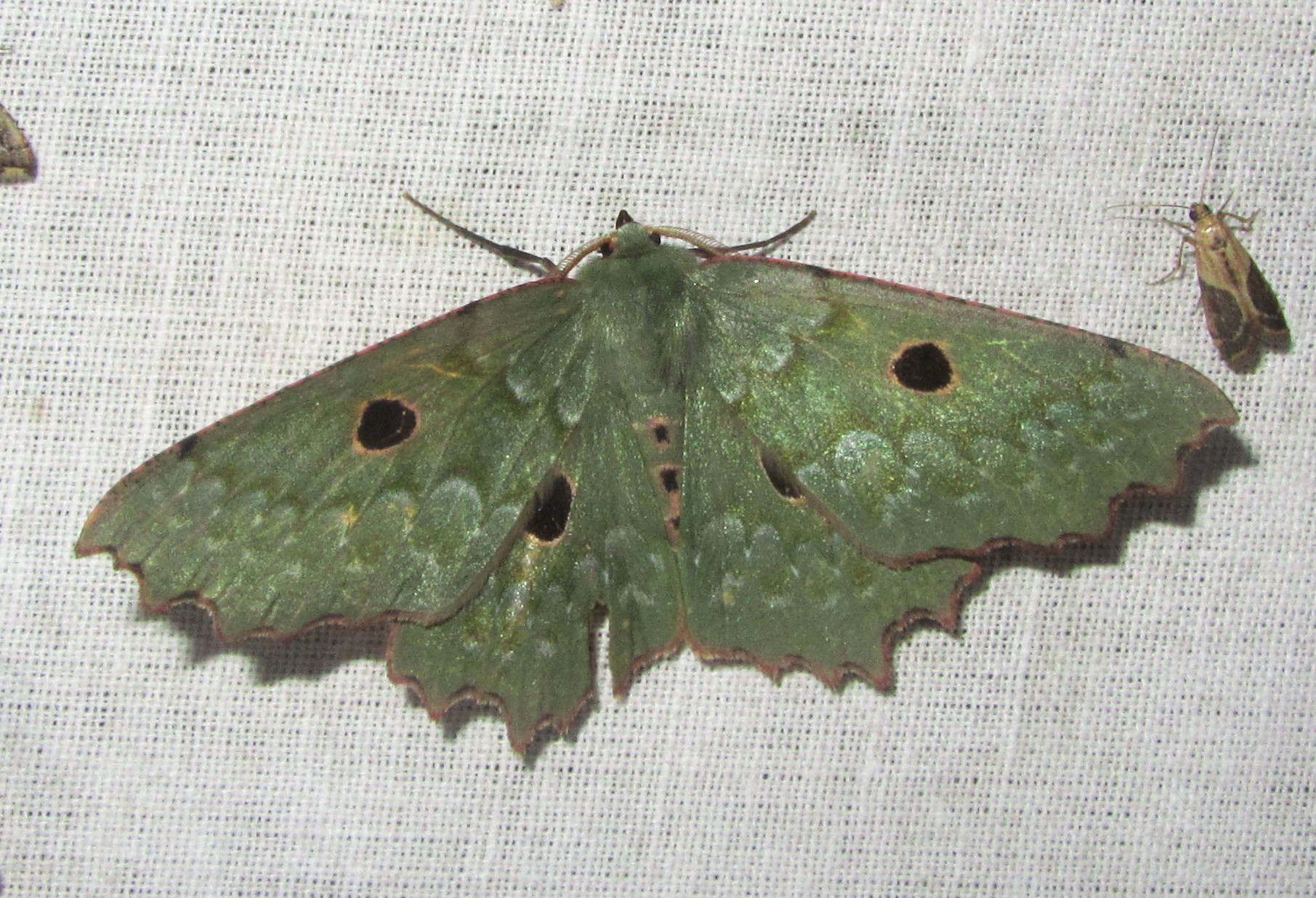

Scientific classification
- Kingdom: Animalia
- Phylum: Arthropoda
- Class: Insecta
- Order: Lepidoptera
- Family: Geometridae
- Genus: Chlorodontopera
- Species: C. discospilata

Binomial name
- Chlorodontopera discospilata (Moore, 1868)

Synonyms
- Odontoptera discospilata Moore, 1868

= Chlorodontopera discospilata =

Species of moth

Chlorodontopera discospilata is a species of moth within the family Geometridae. It was first described by Frederic Moore in 1868. It is native to India, Nepal, and Taiwan.
