= Lophophelma costistrigaria =

Scientific classification
- Kingdom: Animalia
- Phylum: Arthropoda
- Class: Insecta
- Order: Lepidoptera
- Family: Geometridae
- Genus: Lophophelma
- Species: L. costistrigaria

Binomial name
- Lophophelma costistrigaria (Moore, 1868)

Synonyms
- Hypochroma costistrigaria Moore, 1868; Pachyodes costistrigaria; Pingasa costistrigaria; Pseudoterpna costistrigaria; Terpna costistrigaria

Species of moth

Lophophelma costistrigaria is a moth of the family Geometridae first described by Frederic Moore in 1868. It is found in Guangxi, China.
