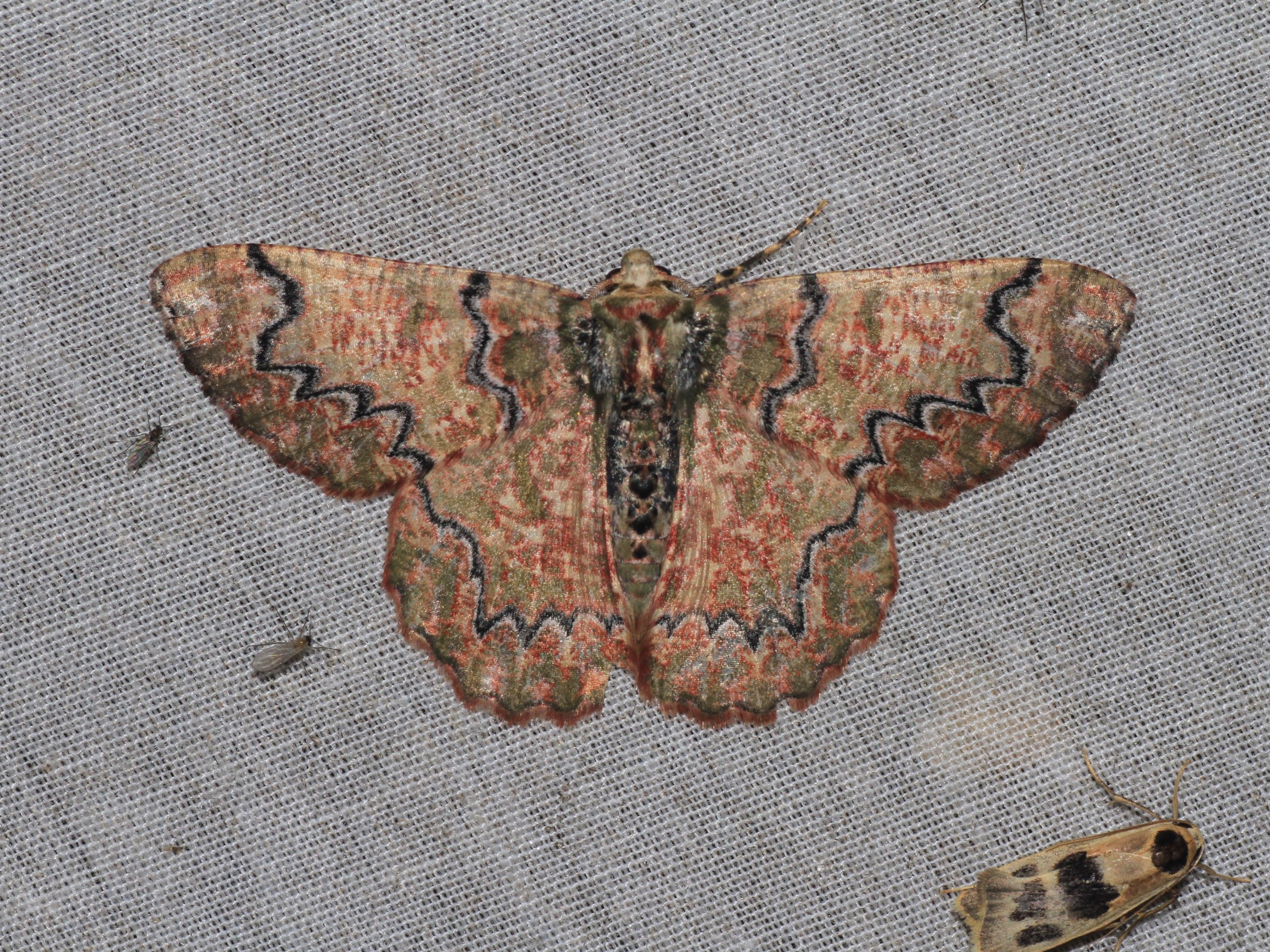

Scientific classification
- Kingdom: Animalia
- Phylum: Arthropoda
- Class: Insecta
- Order: Lepidoptera
- Family: Geometridae
- Genus: Lophophelma
- Species: L. rubroviridata

Binomial name
- Lophophelma rubroviridata (Warren, 1898)

Synonyms
- Terpna rubroviridata Warren, 1898

= Lophophelma rubroviridata =

Species of moth

Lophophelma rubroviridata is a moth of the family Geometridae first described by William Warren in 1898. It is found on Peninsular Malaysia, Sumatra and Borneo. The habitat consists of lower and upper montane forests.
