= Glipostenoda pseudexcisa =

Scientific classification
- Domain: Eukaryota
- Kingdom: Animalia
- Phylum: Arthropoda
- Class: Insecta
- Order: Coleoptera
- Suborder: Polyphaga
- Infraorder: Cucujiformia
- Family: Mordellidae
- Genus: Glipostenoda
- Species: G. pseudexcisa

Binomial name
- Glipostenoda pseudexcisa Nomura, 1975

Species of beetle

Glipostenoda pseudexcisa is a species of beetle in the genus Glipostenoda. It was described in 1975.
