= Neocalyptis chlansignum =

Scientific classification
- Domain: Eukaryota
- Kingdom: Animalia
- Phylum: Arthropoda
- Class: Insecta
- Order: Lepidoptera
- Family: Tortricidae
- Genus: Neocalyptis
- Species: N. chlansignum

Binomial name
- Neocalyptis chlansignum Razowski, 2006

Species of moth

Neocalyptis chlansignum is a species of moth of the family Tortricidae. It is found in India (Jammu and Kashmir).

The wingspan is about 12 millimetres (0.47 in).
