= Neocalyptis krzeminskii =

Scientific classification
- Kingdom: Animalia
- Phylum: Arthropoda
- Class: Insecta
- Order: Lepidoptera
- Family: Tortricidae
- Genus: Neocalyptis
- Species: N. krzeminskii

Binomial name
- Neocalyptis krzeminskii Razowski, 1989

Species of moth

Neocalyptis krzeminskii is a species of moth of the family Tortricidae. It is found in Vietnam.
