= Glipostenoda pallida =

Scientific classification
- Domain: Eukaryota
- Kingdom: Animalia
- Phylum: Arthropoda
- Class: Insecta
- Order: Coleoptera
- Suborder: Polyphaga
- Infraorder: Cucujiformia
- Family: Mordellidae
- Genus: Glipostenoda
- Species: G. pallida

Binomial name
- Glipostenoda pallida (Champion, 1896)

Species of beetles

Glipostenoda pallida is a species of tumbling flower beetle in the family Mordellidae, found in the Caribbean. It is endemic to the island of Saint Vincent.
