= Neocalyptis lacernata =

Scientific classification
- Kingdom: Animalia
- Phylum: Arthropoda
- Clade: Pancrustacea
- Class: Insecta
- Order: Lepidoptera
- Family: Tortricidae
- Genus: Neocalyptis
- Species: N. lacernata

Binomial name
- Neocalyptis lacernata (Yasuda, 1975)

Synonyms
- Argyrotaenia lacernata Yasuda, 1975

Species of moth

Neocalyptis lacernata is a species of moth of the family Tortricidae. It is found in Japan.

The wingspan is about 16 mm.
