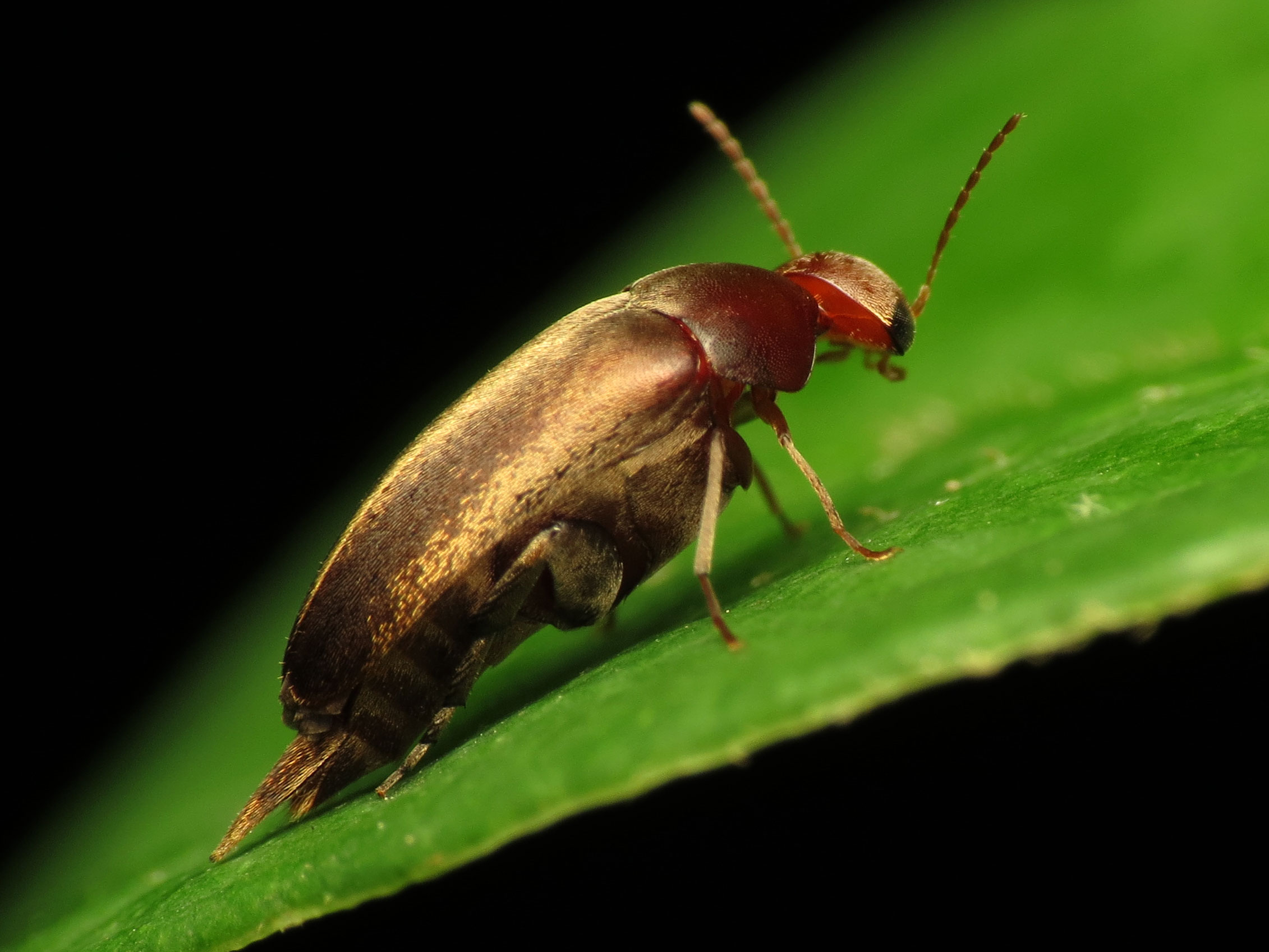
- Glipostenoda ambusta

Scientific classification
- Domain: Eukaryota
- Kingdom: Animalia
- Phylum: Arthropoda
- Class: Insecta
- Order: Coleoptera
- Suborder: Polyphaga
- Infraorder: Cucujiformia
- Family: Mordellidae
- Genus: Glipostenoda
- Species: G. ambusta

Binomial name
- Glipostenoda ambusta (LeConte, 1862)

Synonyms
- Mordellistena ambusta LeConte, 1862; Mordellistena diversa Ray, 1946

= Glipostenoda ambusta =

Species of beetle

Glipostenoda ambusta is a species of beetle in the genus Glipostenoda. It was described in 1862.
