= Neocalyptis nematodes =

Scientific classification
- Domain: Eukaryota
- Kingdom: Animalia
- Phylum: Arthropoda
- Class: Insecta
- Order: Lepidoptera
- Family: Tortricidae
- Genus: Neocalyptis
- Species: N. nematodes

Binomial name
- Neocalyptis nematodes (Meyrick, 1928)

Synonyms
- Capua nematodes Meyrick, 1928

Species of moth

Neocalyptis nematodes is a species of moth of the family Tortricidae. It is found on Luzon in the Philippines and on Sebesi and Java in Indonesia.
