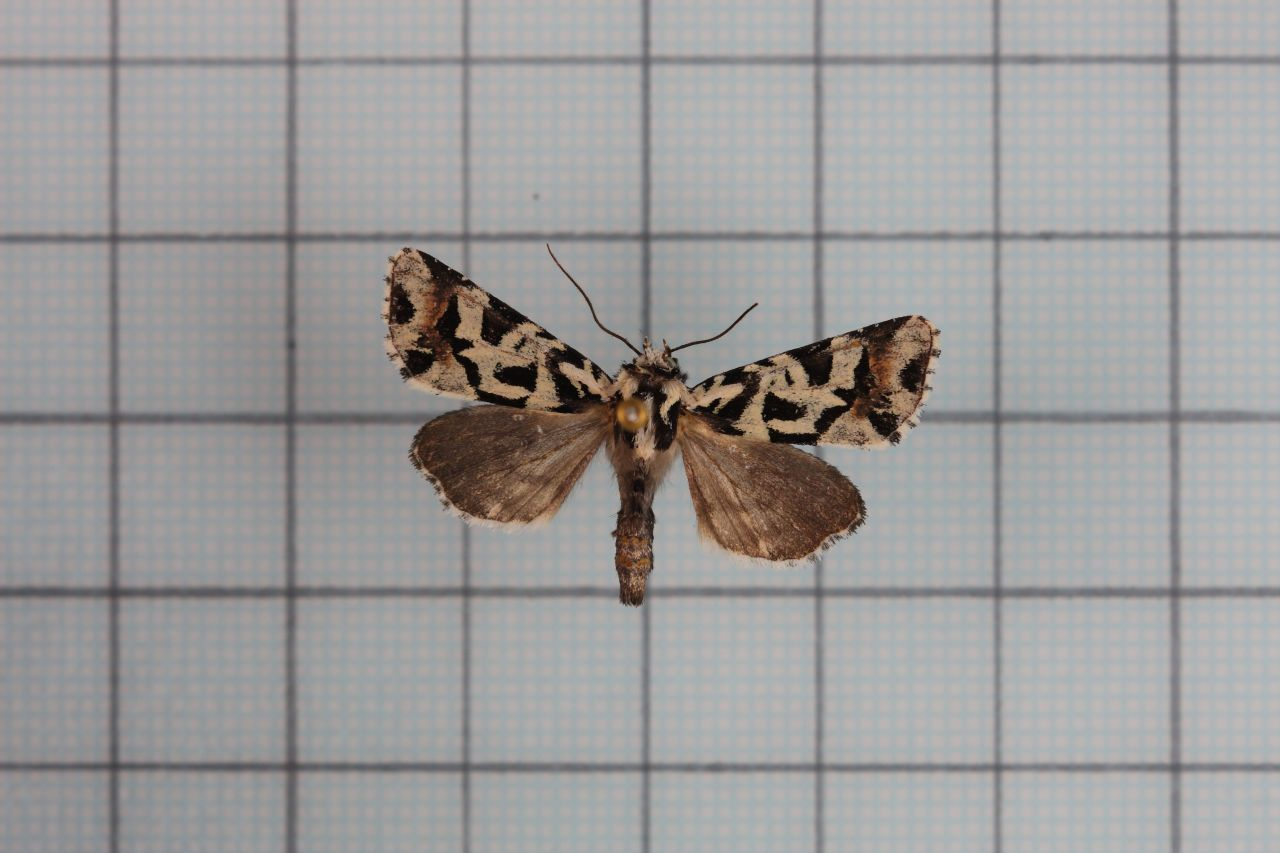
- Female
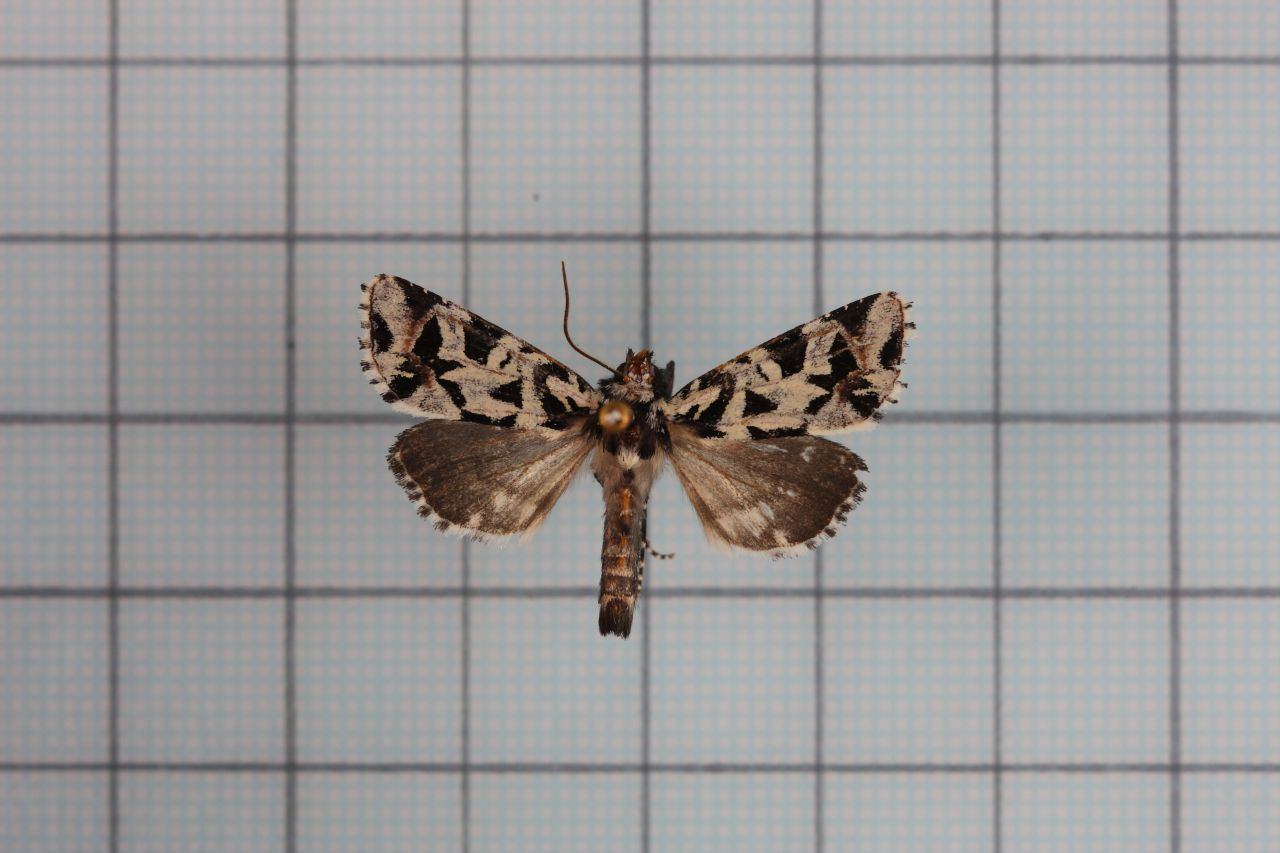
- Male

Scientific classification
- Domain: Eukaryota
- Kingdom: Animalia
- Phylum: Arthropoda
- Class: Insecta
- Order: Lepidoptera
- Superfamily: Noctuoidea
- Family: Noctuidae
- Genus: Chandata
- Species: C. aglaja

Binomial name
- Chandata aglaja (Kishida & Yoshimoto, 1978)

Synonyms
- Euplexia aglaja Kishida & Yoshimoto, 1978

= Chandata aglaja =

Species of moth

Chandata aglaja is a moth of the family Noctuidae. It is found in Taiwan.
