= Glipostenoda shizuokana =

Scientific classification
- Domain: Eukaryota
- Kingdom: Animalia
- Phylum: Arthropoda
- Class: Insecta
- Order: Coleoptera
- Suborder: Polyphaga
- Infraorder: Cucujiformia
- Family: Mordellidae
- Genus: Glipostenoda
- Species: G. shizuokana

Binomial name
- Glipostenoda shizuokana (Kôno, 1935)

Synonyms
- Mordellistena shizuokana Kôno, 1935

Species of beetle

Glipostenoda shizuokana is a species of beetle in the genus Glipostenoda. It was described in 1935.
