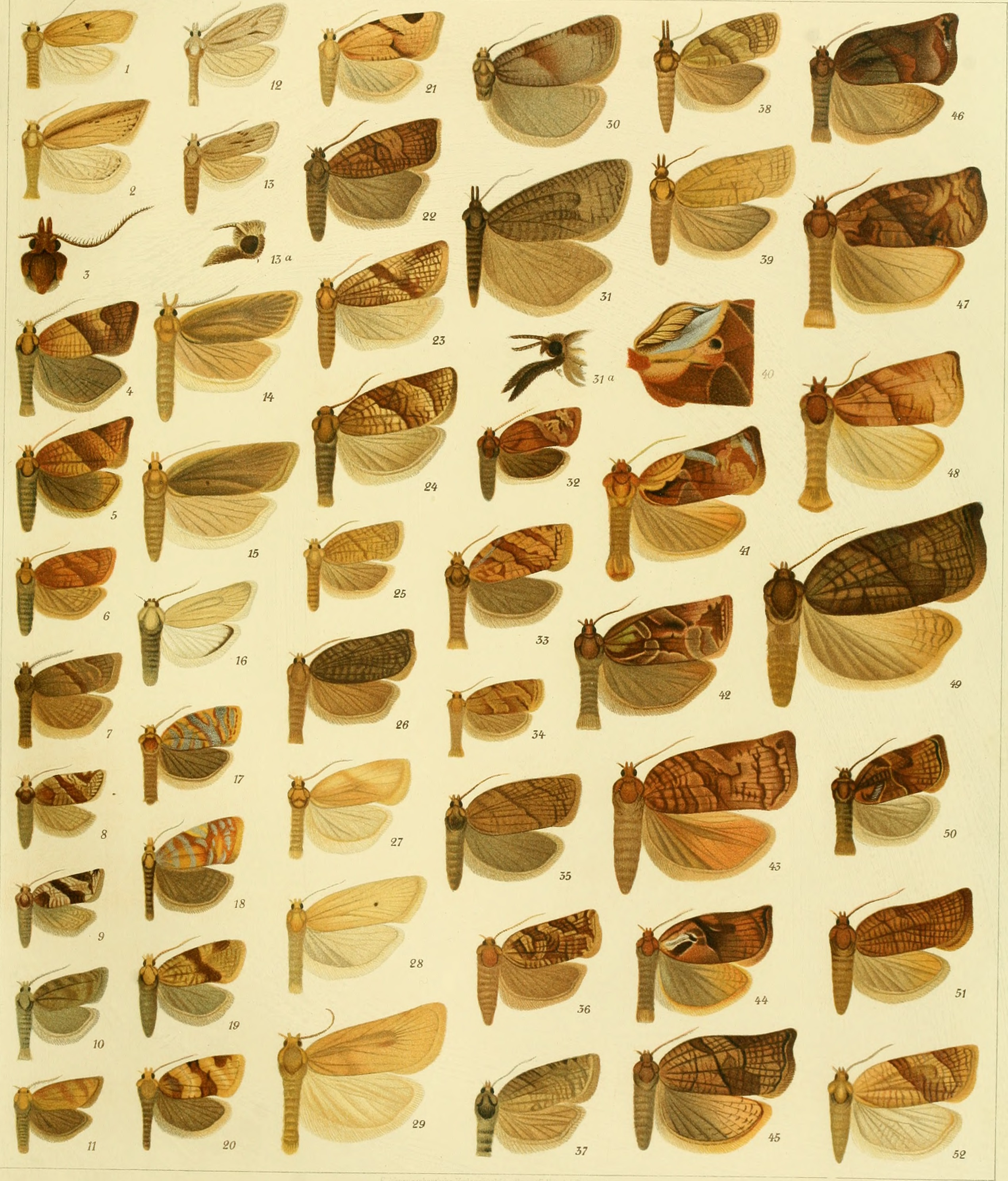
- Neocalyptis angustilineata in Kennel Die palaearktischen tortriciden figure 25 female

Scientific classification
- Kingdom: Animalia
- Phylum: Arthropoda
- Class: Insecta
- Order: Lepidoptera
- Family: Tortricidae
- Subfamily: Tortricinae
- Tribe: Archipini
- Genus: Neocalyptis; Diakonoff, 1941

Synonyms
- Calala Yasuda, 1972; Clepsimorpha Diakonoff, 1971; Clepsiphyes Diakonoff, 1976

= Neocalyptis =

Genus of tortrix moths

Neocalyptis is a genus of moths belonging to the subfamily Tortricinae of the family Tortricidae.

== Species ==
- Neocalyptis affinisana (Walker, 1863)
- Neocalyptis angustilineata (Walsingham, 1900)
- Neocalyptis aperta Diakonoff, 1952
- Neocalyptis brinchangi Razowski, 2005
- Neocalyptis chlansignum Razowski, 2006
- Neocalyptis conicus Rose & Pooni, 2004
- Neocalyptis felina (Meyrick, 1926)
- Neocalyptis fortis Razowski, 2009
- Neocalyptis insularis Diakonoff, 1948
- Neocalyptis kimbaliana Razowski, 2005
- Neocalyptis krzeminskii Razowski, 1989
- Neocalyptis lacernata (Yasuda, 1975)
- Neocalyptis ladakhana Razowski, 2006
- Neocalyptis liratana (Christoph, 1881)
- Neocalyptis magnilabis Razowski, 2009
- Neocalyptis malaysiana Razowski, 2005
- Neocalyptis molesta (Meyrick, 1910)
- Neocalyptis monotoma Diakonoff, 1953
- Neocalyptis morata Razowski, 1984
- Neocalyptis nematodes (Meyrick, 1928)
- Neocalyptis nexilis Razowski, 1984
- Neocalyptis nuristana (Razowski, 1967)
- Neocalyptis owadai (Kawabe, 1992)
- Neocalyptis pigra (Meyrick, 1921)
- Neocalyptis platytera (Diakonoff, 1983)
- Neocalyptis rotundata Diakonoff, 1941
- Neocalyptis sabahia Razowski, 2005
- Neocalyptis sodaliana Kuznetzov, 1992
- Neocalyptis taiwana Razowski, 2000
- Neocalyptis telutanda Diakonoff, 1941
- Neocalyptis tricensa (Meyrick, 1912)
- Neocalyptis utarica Razowski, 2005

== See also ==
- List of Tortricidae genera
