= Neocalyptis owadai =

Scientific classification
- Kingdom: Animalia
- Phylum: Arthropoda
- Class: Insecta
- Order: Lepidoptera
- Family: Tortricidae
- Genus: Neocalyptis
- Species: N. owadai

Binomial name
- Neocalyptis owadai (Kawabe, 1992)

Synonyms
- Clepsis owadai Kawabe, 1992

Species of moth

Neocalyptis owadai is a species of moth of the family Tortricidae. It is located in Taiwan.
