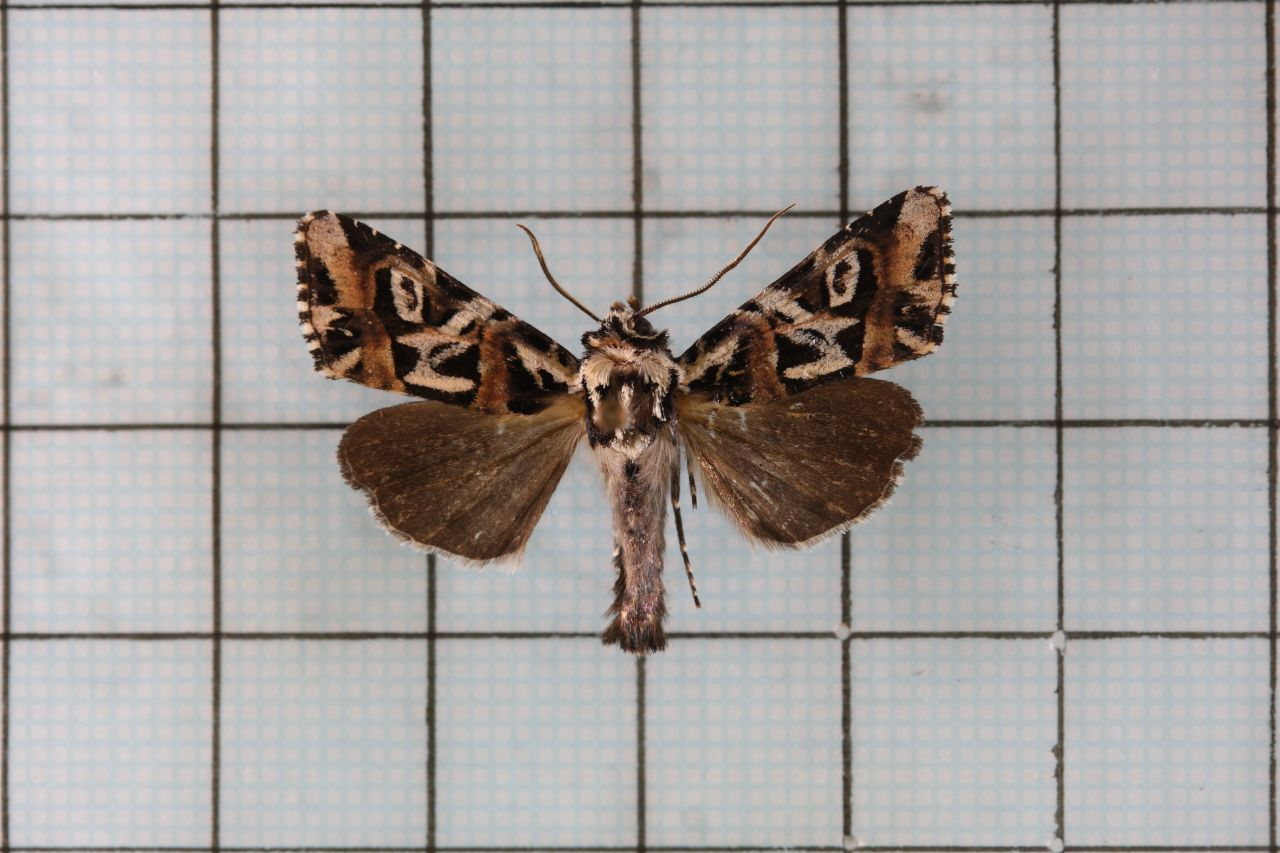
- Chandata taiwana

Scientific classification
- Domain: Eukaryota
- Kingdom: Animalia
- Phylum: Arthropoda
- Class: Insecta
- Order: Lepidoptera
- Superfamily: Noctuoidea
- Family: Noctuidae
- Genus: Chandata; Moore, 1882

= Chandata =

Genus of moths

Chandata is a genus of moths of the family Noctuidae.

== Species ==
- Chandata aglaja (Kishida & Yoshimoto, 1978)
- Chandata bella (Butler, 1881)
- Chandata c-nigrum Yoshimoto, 1982
- Chandata partita Moore, 1882
- Chandata taiwana Yoshimoto, 1982
- Chandata tridentata Yoshimoto, 1982
