= Glipostenoda mahena =

Scientific classification
- Kingdom: Animalia
- Phylum: Arthropoda
- Class: Insecta
- Order: Coleoptera
- Suborder: Polyphaga
- Infraorder: Cucujiformia
- Family: Mordellidae
- Subfamily: Mordellinae
- Tribe: Mordellistenini
- Genus: Glipostenoda
- Species: G. mahena

Binomial name
- Glipostenoda mahena (Kolbe, 1910)

Synonyms
- Mordellistena mahena (Kolbe, 1910)

Species of beetle

Glipostenoda mahena is a species of tumbling flower beetle in the family Mordellidae, found in the Seychelles.
