= Neocalyptis monotoma =

Scientific classification
- Kingdom: Animalia
- Phylum: Arthropoda
- Clade: Pancrustacea
- Class: Insecta
- Order: Lepidoptera
- Family: Tortricidae
- Genus: Neocalyptis
- Species: N. monotoma

Binomial name
- Neocalyptis monotoma Diakonoff, 1953

Species of moth

Neocalyptis monotoma is a species of moth of the family Tortricidae. It is found on New Guinea.
