= Glipostenoda neocastanea =

Scientific classification
- Domain: Eukaryota
- Kingdom: Animalia
- Phylum: Arthropoda
- Class: Insecta
- Order: Coleoptera
- Suborder: Polyphaga
- Infraorder: Cucujiformia
- Family: Mordellidae
- Subfamily: Mordellinae
- Tribe: Mordellistenini
- Genus: Glipostenoda
- Species: G. neocastanea

Binomial name
- Glipostenoda neocastanea Batten, 1990

Species of beetle

Glipostenoda neocastanea is a species of beetle in the genus Glipostenoda. It was described in 1990.
