= Glipostenoda rosseola =

Scientific classification
- Domain: Eukaryota
- Kingdom: Animalia
- Phylum: Arthropoda
- Class: Insecta
- Order: Coleoptera
- Suborder: Polyphaga
- Infraorder: Cucujiformia
- Family: Mordellidae
- Genus: Glipostenoda
- Species: G. rosseola

Binomial name
- Glipostenoda rosseola (Marseul, 1876)

Synonyms
- Mordella rosseola Marseul, 1876

Species of beetle

Glipostenoda rosseola is a species of beetle in the genus Glipostenoda. It was described in 1876.
