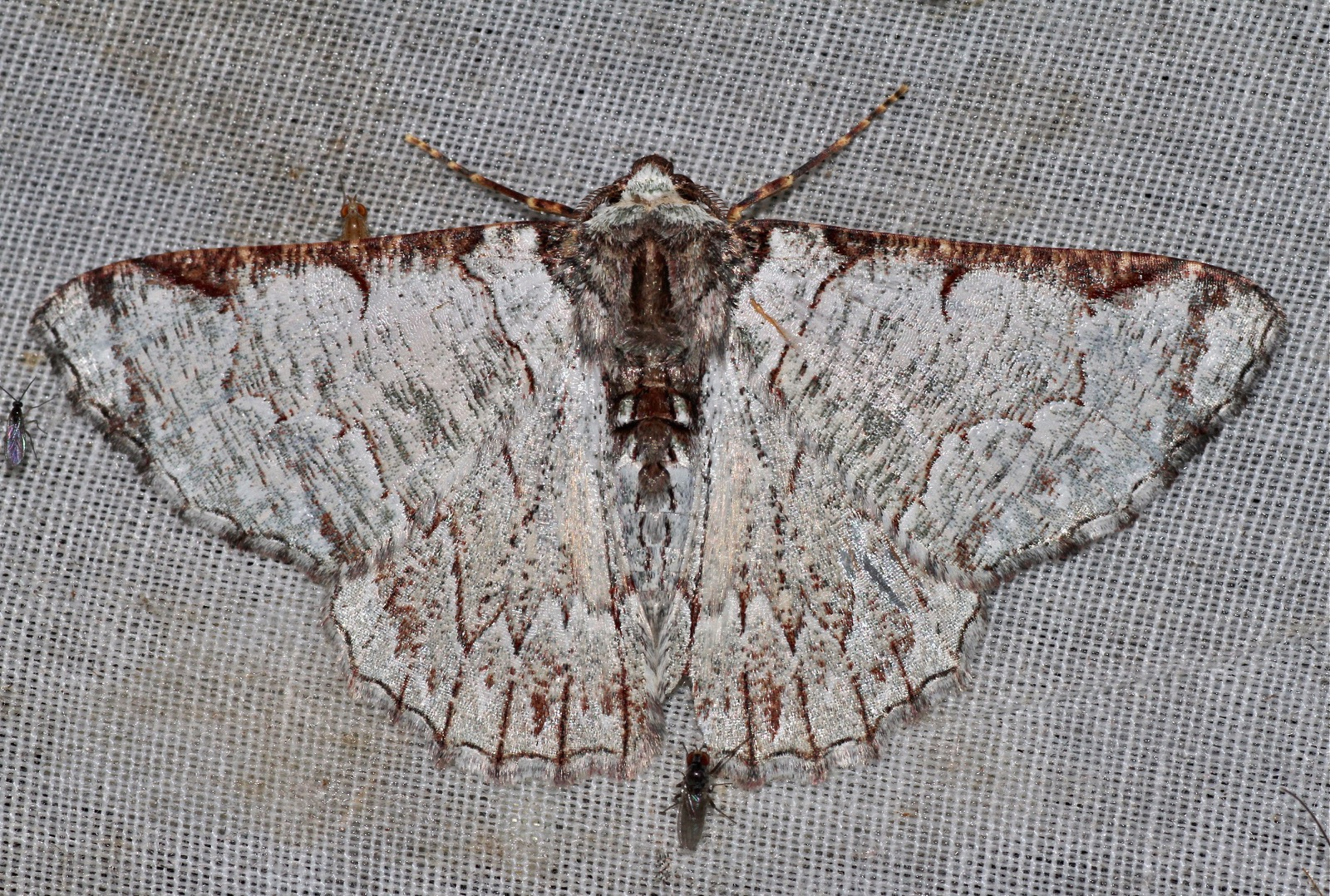

Scientific classification
- Kingdom: Animalia
- Phylum: Arthropoda
- Class: Insecta
- Order: Lepidoptera
- Family: Geometridae
- Genus: Lophophelma
- Species: L. luteipes

Binomial name
- Lophophelma luteipes (Felder & Rogenhofer, 1875)

Synonyms
- Pachyodes luteipes Felder & Rogenhofer, 1875; Terpna luteipes; Pingasa similis Moore, 1888; Terpna enthusiastes Prout, 1927

= Lophophelma luteipes =

Species of moth

Lophophelma luteipes is a moth of the family Geometridae first described by Felder and Rogenhofer in 1875. It is found in China, the north-eastern Himalayas and Sundaland. The habitat consists of montane areas.

== Subspecies ==
- Lophophelma luteipes luteipes
- Lophophelma luteipes enthusiastes (Prout, 1927)
