= Neocalyptis conicus =

Scientific classification
- Domain: Eukaryota
- Kingdom: Animalia
- Phylum: Arthropoda
- Class: Insecta
- Order: Lepidoptera
- Family: Tortricidae
- Genus: Neocalyptis
- Species: N. conicus

Binomial name
- Neocalyptis conicus Rose & Pooni, 2004

Species of moth

Neocalyptis conicus is a species of moth of the family Tortricidae. It is found in north-western India.
