= Lophophelma funebrosa =

Scientific classification
- Kingdom: Animalia
- Phylum: Arthropoda
- Class: Insecta
- Order: Lepidoptera
- Family: Geometridae
- Genus: Lophophelma
- Species: L. funebrosa

Binomial name
- Lophophelma funebrosa (Warren, 1896)

Synonyms
- Terpna funebrosa Warren, 1896; Terpna tenuilinea Warren, 1899

Species of moth

Lophophelma funebrosa is a moth of the family Geometridae first described by William Warren in 1896. It is found in the north-eastern Himalayas and Sundaland and on Sumbawa. The habitat consists of lowerland forests.

== Subspecies ==
- Lophophelma funebrosa funebrosa (north-eastern Himalaya, Sundaland)
- Lophophelma funebrosa tenuilinea (Warren, 1899) (Sumbawa)
