= Glipostenoda incognita =

Scientific classification
- Domain: Eukaryota
- Kingdom: Animalia
- Phylum: Arthropoda
- Class: Insecta
- Order: Coleoptera
- Suborder: Polyphaga
- Infraorder: Cucujiformia
- Family: Mordellidae
- Genus: Glipostenoda
- Species: G. incognita

Binomial name
- Glipostenoda incognita Ermisch, 1962

Species of beetle

Glipostenoda incognita is a species of beetle in the genus Glipostenoda. It was described in 1962.
