= Lophophelma eucryphes =

Scientific classification
- Kingdom: Animalia
- Phylum: Arthropoda
- Class: Insecta
- Order: Lepidoptera
- Family: Geometridae
- Genus: Lophophelma
- Species: L. eucryphes

Binomial name
- Lophophelma eucryphes (West, 1930)

Synonyms
- Terpna eucryphes West, 1930

Species of moth

Lophophelma eucryphes is a moth of the family Geometridae first described by West in 1930. It is found in the Philippines.
