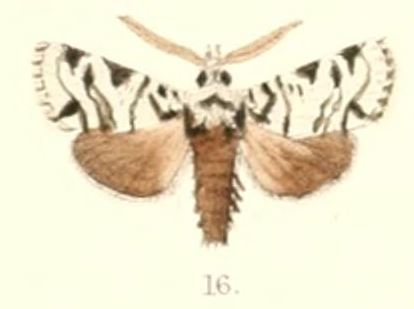

Scientific classification
- Domain: Eukaryota
- Kingdom: Animalia
- Phylum: Arthropoda
- Class: Insecta
- Order: Lepidoptera
- Superfamily: Noctuoidea
- Family: Noctuidae
- Genus: Chandata
- Species: C. partita

Binomial name
- Chandata partita Moore, 1882

= Chandata partita =

Species of moth

Chandata partita is a moth of the family Noctuidae first described by Frederic Moore in 1882. It is found in India.
