= Neocalyptis sodaliana =

Scientific classification
- Domain: Eukaryota
- Kingdom: Animalia
- Phylum: Arthropoda
- Class: Insecta
- Order: Lepidoptera
- Family: Tortricidae
- Genus: Neocalyptis
- Species: N. sodaliana

Binomial name
- Neocalyptis sodaliana Kuznetzov, 1992

Species of moth

Neocalyptis sodaliana is a species of moth of the family Tortricidae. It is found in Vietnam.
