= Lophophelma varicoloraria =

Scientific classification
- Kingdom: Animalia
- Phylum: Arthropoda
- Class: Insecta
- Order: Lepidoptera
- Family: Geometridae
- Genus: Lophophelma
- Species: L. varicoloraria

Binomial name
- Lophophelma varicoloraria (Moore, 1868)

Synonyms
- Hypochroma varicoloraria Moore, 1868; Pachyodes varicoloraria; Pseudoterpna varicoloraria

Species of moth

Lophophelma varicoloraria is a moth of the family Geometridae first described by Frederic Moore in 1868. It is found in China (Hunan, Guangxi, Beijing, Xizang, Hainan, Jiangxi, Sichuan).
