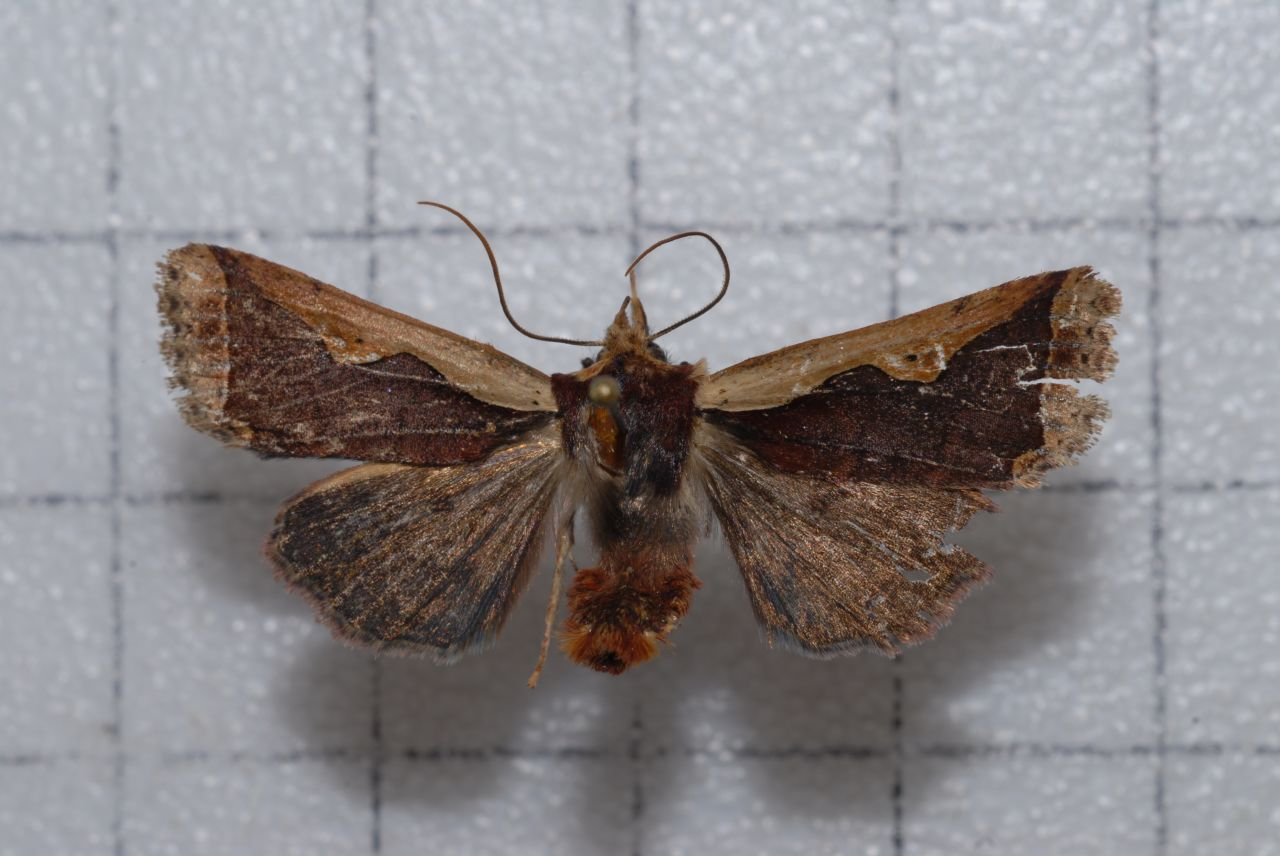
- Rhynchaglaea hemixantha

Scientific classification
- Kingdom: Animalia
- Phylum: Arthropoda
- Class: Insecta
- Order: Lepidoptera
- Superfamily: Noctuoidea
- Family: Noctuidae
- Subfamily: Cuculliinae
- Genus: Rhynchaglaea; Hampson, 1906

= Rhynchaglaea =

Genus of moths

Rhynchaglaea is a genus of moths of the family Noctuidae.

== Species ==
- Rhynchaglaea fuscipennis Sugi, 1958
- Rhynchaglaea hemixantha Sugi, 1980
- Rhynchaglaea leuteomixta Hreblay & Ronkay, 1998
- Rhynchaglaea perscitula Kobayashi & Owada, 2006
- Rhynchaglaea scitula (Butler, 1879)
- Rhynchaglaea taiwana Sugi, 1980
- Rhynchaglaea terngjyi Chang, 1991
