= Neocalyptis felina =

Scientific classification
- Kingdom: Animalia
- Phylum: Arthropoda
- Class: Insecta
- Order: Lepidoptera
- Family: Tortricidae
- Genus: Neocalyptis
- Species: N. felina

Binomial name
- Neocalyptis felina (Meyrick, 1926)

Synonyms
- Tortrix felina Meyrick, 1926

Species of moth

Neocalyptis felina is a species of moth of the family Tortricidae. It is found on Borneo.
