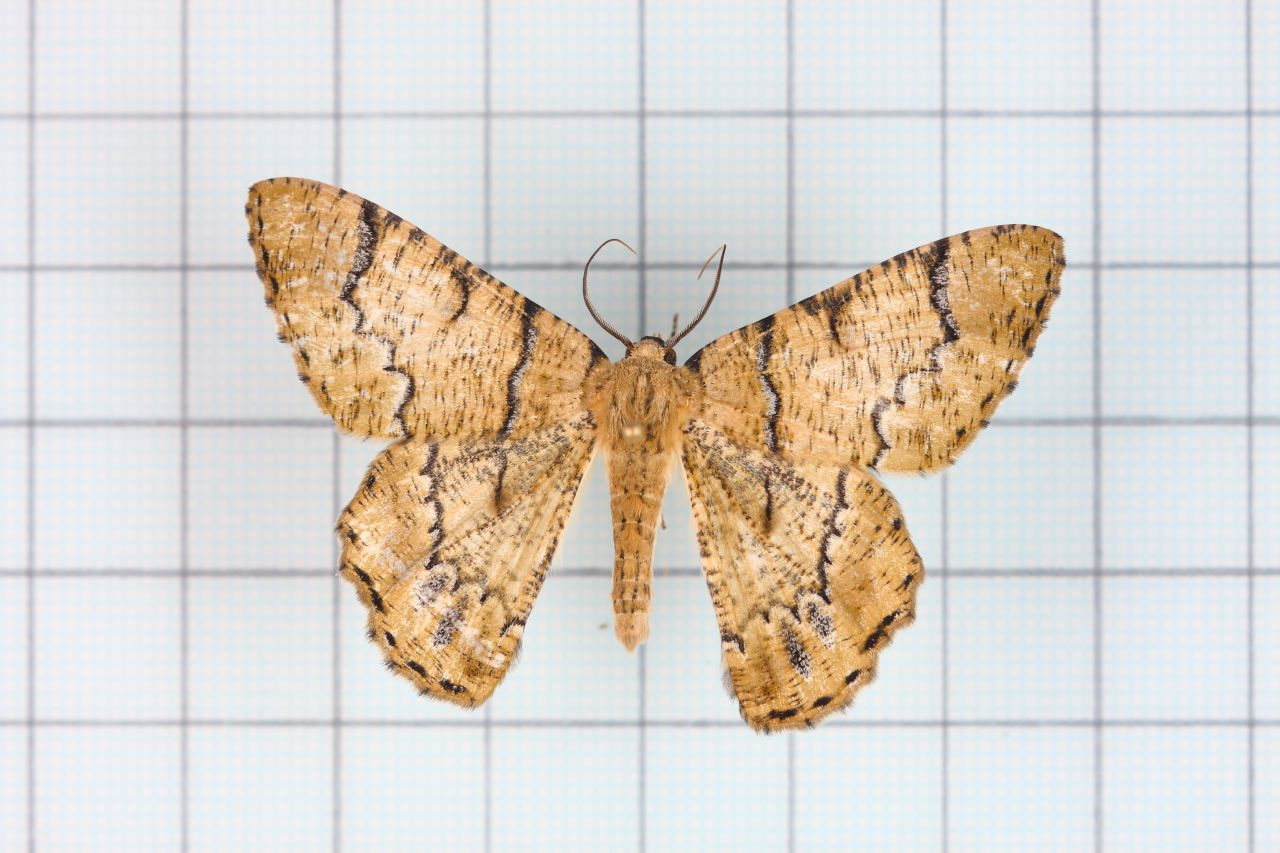

Scientific classification
- Kingdom: Animalia
- Phylum: Arthropoda
- Class: Insecta
- Order: Lepidoptera
- Family: Geometridae
- Genus: Lophophelma
- Species: L. iterans

Binomial name
- Lophophelma iterans (L. B. Prout, 1926)

Synonyms
- Pachyodes iterans (Prout, 1926); Terpna iterans Prout, 1926; Terpna onerosus Inoue, 1970; Pachyodes iterans onerosus Inoue, 1992

= Lophophelma iterans =

Species of moth

Lophophelma iterans is a moth of the family Geometridae first described by Louis Beethoven Prout in 1926. It is found in China (Guangxi, Shanghai, Zhejiang, Henan, Fujian, Sichuan, Hubei, Gansu, Hunan, Jiangxi, Hainan, Shaanxi) and Taiwan.

The wingspan is 50–65 mm.

== Subspecies ==
- Lophophelma iterans iterans (China: Hubei, Hunan, Gansu, Guangxi, Shanghai, Zhejiang, Fujian, Henan, Hainan, Jiangxi, Sichuan, Shaanxi)
- Lophophelma iterans onerosus (Inoue, 1970) (Taiwan)
