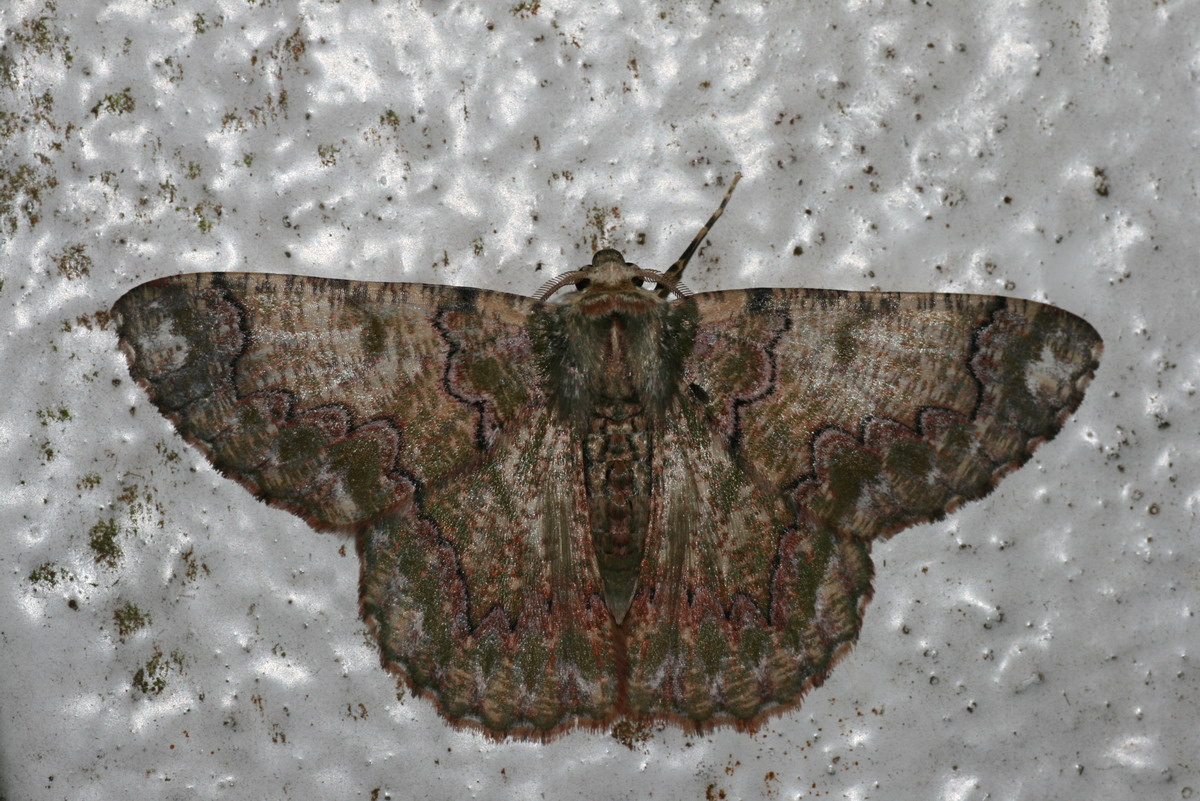
- Lophophelma vigens

Scientific classification
- Kingdom: Animalia
- Phylum: Arthropoda
- Class: Insecta
- Order: Lepidoptera
- Family: Geometridae
- Genus: Lophophelma
- Species: L. vigens

Binomial name
- Lophophelma vigens (Butler, 1880)

Synonyms
- Hypochroma vigens Butler, 1880; Terpna vigens; Terpna ruficoloraria Warren, 1897

= Lophophelma vigens =

Species of moth

Lophophelma vigens is a moth of the family Geometridae first described by Arthur Gardiner Butler in 1880. It is found in the Himalayas and on Peninsular Malaysia, Sumatra and Borneo. The habitat consists of lower and upper montane forests.

Adults have are rather uniform brown.

== Subspecies ==
- Lophophelma vigens vigens
- Lophophelma vigens ruficoloraria (Warren, 1897)
