= Neocalyptis molesta =

Scientific classification
- Kingdom: Animalia
- Phylum: Arthropoda
- Class: Insecta
- Order: Lepidoptera
- Family: Tortricidae
- Genus: Neocalyptis
- Species: N. molesta

Binomial name
- Neocalyptis molesta (Meyrick, 1910)

Synonyms
- Tortrix molesta Meyrick, 1910; Capua oxygona Lower, 1908

Species of moth

Neocalyptis molesta is a species of moth of the family Tortricidae. It is found in Australia, where it has been recorded from Queensland.

The wingspan is about 15 mm. The wings are various shades of brown.
