= Neocalyptis nuristana =

Scientific classification
- Kingdom: Animalia
- Phylum: Arthropoda
- Class: Insecta
- Order: Lepidoptera
- Family: Tortricidae
- Genus: Neocalyptis
- Species: N. nuristana

Binomial name
- Neocalyptis nuristana (Razowski, 1967)

Synonyms
- Clepsis nuristana Razowski, 1967

Species of moth

Neocalyptis nuristana is a species of moth of the family Tortricidae. It is found in Afghanistan.
