= Neocalyptis morata =

Scientific classification
- Kingdom: Animalia
- Phylum: Arthropoda
- Class: Insecta
- Order: Lepidoptera
- Family: Tortricidae
- Genus: Neocalyptis
- Species: N. morata

Binomial name
- Neocalyptis morata Razowski, 1984

Species of moth

Neocalyptis morata is a species of moth of the family Tortricidae. It is found in Zhejiang, China.
