= Glipostenoda coleae =

Scientific classification
- Kingdom: Animalia
- Phylum: Arthropoda
- Class: Insecta
- Order: Coleoptera
- Suborder: Polyphaga
- Infraorder: Cucujiformia
- Family: Mordellidae
- Subfamily: Mordellinae
- Tribe: Mordellistenini
- Genus: Glipostenoda
- Species: G. coleae

Binomial name
- Glipostenoda coleae (Champion, 1917)

Synonyms
- Mordellistena coleae (Champion, 1917)

Species of beetle

Glipostenoda coleae is a species of tumbling flower beetle in the family Mordellidae, found in the Seychelles.
