= Neocalyptis platytera =

Scientific classification
- Domain: Eukaryota
- Kingdom: Animalia
- Phylum: Arthropoda
- Class: Insecta
- Order: Lepidoptera
- Family: Tortricidae
- Genus: Neocalyptis
- Species: N. platytera

Binomial name
- Neocalyptis platytera (Diakonoff, 1983)

Synonyms
- Clepsis platytera Diakonoff, 1983

Species of moth

Neocalyptis platytera is a species of moth of the family Tortricidae. It is found on Sumatra in Indonesia.
