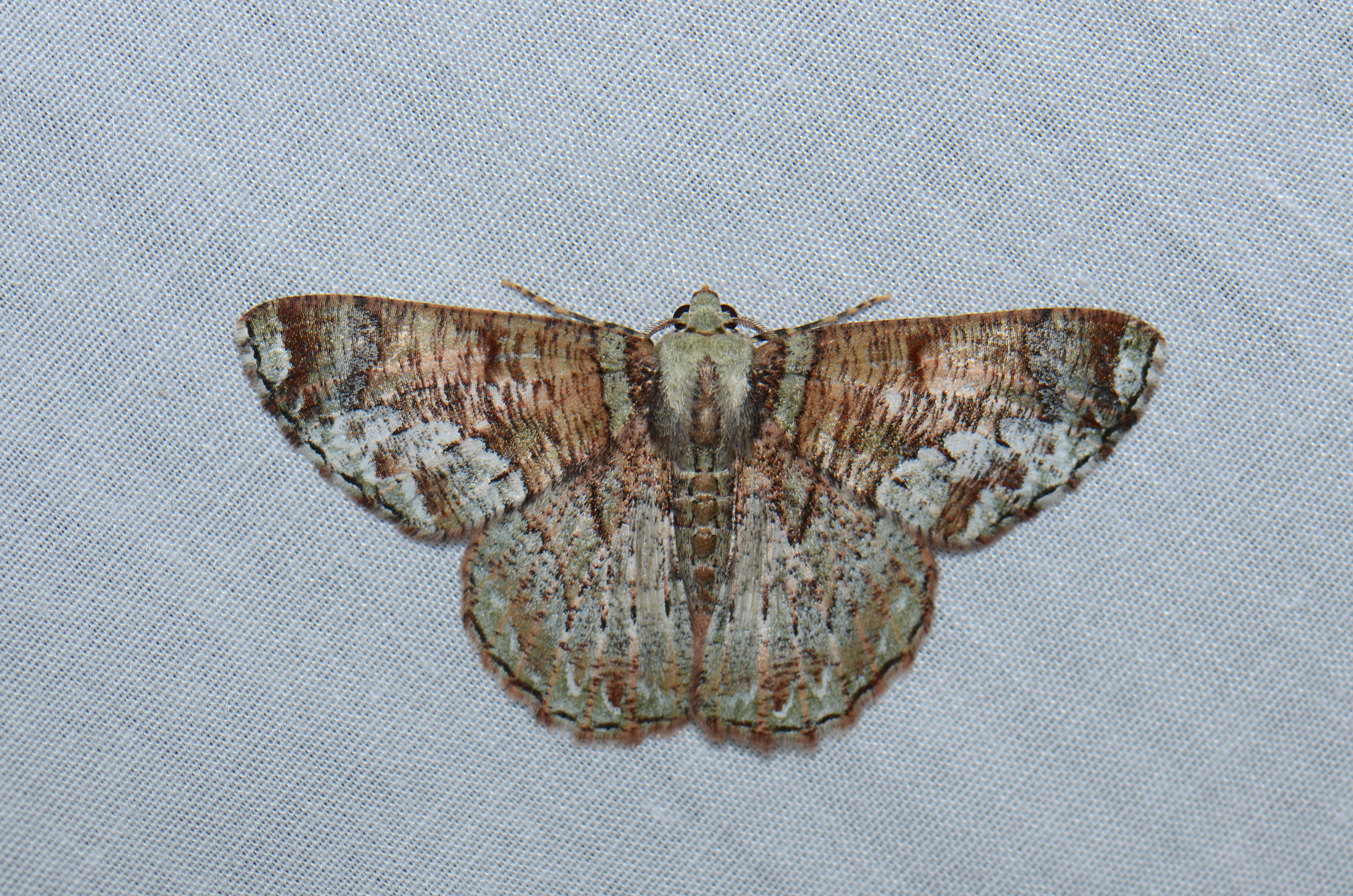
- Lophophelma erionoma

Scientific classification
- Kingdom: Animalia
- Phylum: Arthropoda
- Class: Insecta
- Order: Lepidoptera
- Family: Geometridae
- Genus: Lophophelma
- Species: L. erionoma

Binomial name
- Lophophelma erionoma (C. Swinhoe, 1893)

Synonyms
- Pachyodes erionoma C. Swinhoe, 1893; Terpna albicomitata L. B. Prout, 1927; Terpna furvirubens L. B. Prout, 1934; Terpna kiangsiensis Chu, 1981; Terpna subnubigosa L. B. Prout, 1927; Terpna erionoma imitaria Sterneck, 1928

= Lophophelma erionoma =

Species of moth

Lophophelma erionoma is a moth of the family Geometridae first described by Charles Swinhoe in 1893. It is found in the Chinese provinces of Hunan, Guangxi, Zhejiang, Fujian, Jiangxi, Hainan and Sichuan, and in the north-eastern Himalayas and Sundaland. The habitat consists of lower montane and upper montane forests.

== Subspecies ==
- Lophophelma erionoma erionoma (north-western Himalaya)
- Lophophelma erionoma albicomitata (L. B. Prout, 1927) (Sundaland)
- Lophophelma erionoma kiangsiensis (Chu, 1981) (China: Zhejiang, Jiangxi)
- Lophophelma erionoma subnubigosa (L. B. Prout, 1927) (western China)
