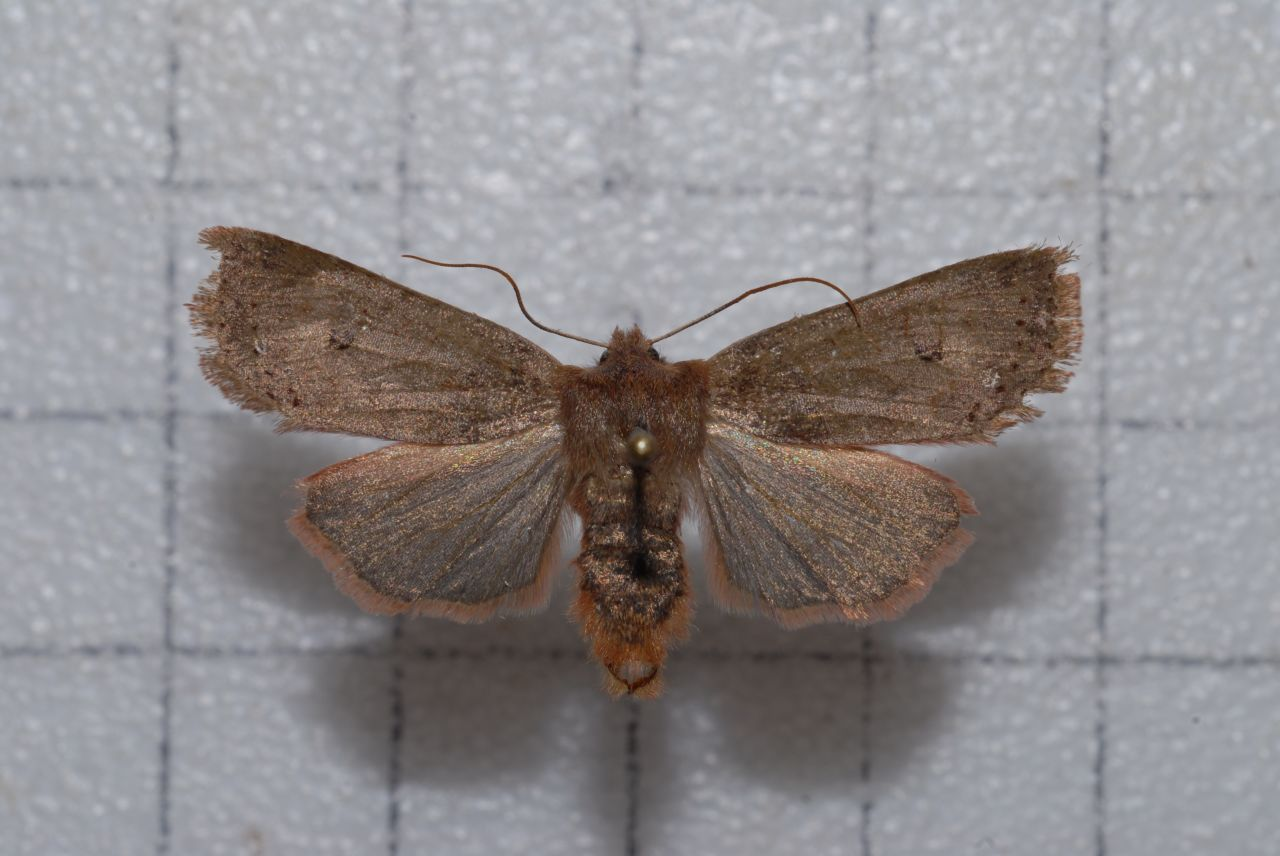

Scientific classification
- Kingdom: Animalia
- Phylum: Arthropoda
- Class: Insecta
- Order: Lepidoptera
- Superfamily: Noctuoidea
- Family: Noctuidae
- Genus: Rhynchaglaea
- Species: R. perscitula

Binomial name
- Rhynchaglaea perscitula Kobayashi & Owada, 2006

= Rhynchaglaea perscitula =

Species of moth

Rhynchaglaea perscitula is a species of moth of the family Noctuidae which is endemic to Taiwan.
