= Lophophelma ruficosta =

Scientific classification
- Kingdom: Animalia
- Phylum: Arthropoda
- Class: Insecta
- Order: Lepidoptera
- Family: Geometridae
- Genus: Lophophelma
- Species: L. ruficosta

Binomial name
- Lophophelma ruficosta (Hampson, 1891)

Synonyms
- Pachyodes ruficosta Hampson, 1891

Species of moth

Lophophelma ruficosta is a moth of the family Geometridae first described by George Hampson in 1891. It is found in southern India.
