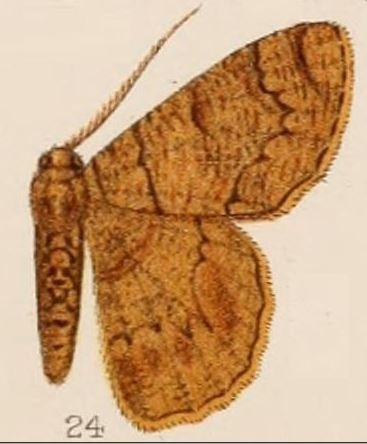

Scientific classification
- Kingdom: Animalia
- Phylum: Arthropoda
- Class: Insecta
- Order: Lepidoptera
- Family: Geometridae
- Genus: Lophophelma
- Species: L. neonoma

Binomial name
- Lophophelma neonoma (Hampson, 1907)

Synonyms
- Pseudoterpna neonoma Hampson, 1907

= Lophophelma neonoma =

Species of moth

Lophophelma neonoma is a moth of the family Geometridae first described by George Hampson in 1907. It is found in Sri Lanka.

This species has a wingspan of 42 mm.
