= Lophophelma albapex =

Scientific classification
- Kingdom: Animalia
- Phylum: Arthropoda
- Class: Insecta
- Order: Lepidoptera
- Family: Geometridae
- Genus: Lophophelma
- Species: L. albapex

Binomial name
- Lophophelma albapex (Inoue, 1988)

Synonyms
- Pachyodes albapex Inoue, 1988

Species of moth

Lophophelma albapex is a moth of the family Geometridae first described by Hiroshi Inoue in 1988. It is found on Sulawesi.
