= Lophophelma calaurops =

Scientific classification
- Kingdom: Animalia
- Phylum: Arthropoda
- Class: Insecta
- Order: Lepidoptera
- Family: Geometridae
- Genus: Lophophelma
- Species: L. calaurops

Binomial name
- Lophophelma calaurops (L. B. Prout, 1912)

Synonyms
- Terpna calaurops Prout, 1912; Terpna calautops; Lophophelma calautops

Species of moth

Lophophelma calaurops is a moth of the family Geometridae first described by Louis Beethoven Prout in 1912. It is found in China (Hong Kong, Fujian, Hainan, Guangdong).
