= Glipostenoda guana =

Scientific classification
- Kingdom: Animalia
- Phylum: Arthropoda
- Class: Insecta
- Order: Coleoptera
- Suborder: Polyphaga
- Infraorder: Cucujiformia
- Family: Mordellidae
- Genus: Glipostenoda
- Species: G. guana

Binomial name
- Glipostenoda guana Lu & Ivie, 1999

Species of beetle

Glipostenoda guana is a species of beetle in the genus Glipostenoda. It was described in 1999.
