= Neocalyptis sabahia =

Scientific classification
- Kingdom: Animalia
- Phylum: Arthropoda
- Class: Insecta
- Order: Lepidoptera
- Family: Tortricidae
- Genus: Neocalyptis
- Species: N. sabahia

Binomial name
- Neocalyptis sabahia Razowski, 2005

Species of moth

Neocalyptis sabahia is a species of moth of the family Tortricidae. It is found on Borneo.
