= Neocalyptis affinisana =

Scientific classification
- Kingdom: Animalia
- Phylum: Arthropoda
- Class: Insecta
- Order: Lepidoptera
- Family: Tortricidae
- Genus: Neocalyptis
- Species: N. affinisana

Binomial name
- Neocalyptis affinisana (Walker, 1863)

Synonyms
- Tortrix affinisana Walker, 1863; Capua affiniana Meyrick, in Wagner, 1912; Epagoge affiniana Diakonoff, 1941; Epagoge affinisana Diakonoff, 1952

Species of moth

Neocalyptis affinisana is a species of moth of the family Tortricidae first described by Francis Walker in 1863. It is found in India, Sri Lanka, Vietnam, Indonesia, Taiwan and Japan.

The wingspan is 13–14 mm. It is a polyphagous pest of several plants.
