= Rhynchaglaea leuteomixta =

Scientific classification
- Domain: Eukaryota
- Kingdom: Animalia
- Phylum: Arthropoda
- Class: Insecta
- Order: Lepidoptera
- Superfamily: Noctuoidea
- Family: Noctuidae
- Genus: Rhynchaglaea
- Species: R. leuteomixta

Binomial name
- Rhynchaglaea leuteomixta Hreblay & Ronkay, 1998

Species of moth

Rhynchaglaea leuteomixta is a species of moth of the family Noctuidae. It is found in Taiwan.
