= Neocalyptis insularis =

Scientific classification
- Domain: Eukaryota
- Kingdom: Animalia
- Phylum: Arthropoda
- Class: Insecta
- Order: Lepidoptera
- Family: Tortricidae
- Genus: Neocalyptis
- Species: N. insularis

Binomial name
- Neocalyptis insularis Diakonoff, 1948

Species of moth

Neocalyptis insularis is a species of moth of the family Tortricidae. It is found on Java in Indonesia.
