= Neocalyptis malaysiana =

Scientific classification
- Kingdom: Animalia
- Phylum: Arthropoda
- Class: Insecta
- Order: Lepidoptera
- Family: Tortricidae
- Genus: Neocalyptis
- Species: N. malaysiana

Binomial name
- Neocalyptis malaysiana Razowski, 2005

Species of moth

Neocalyptis malaysiana is a species of moth of the family Tortricidae. It is found in Malaysia.
