= Lophophelma obtecta =

Scientific classification
- Kingdom: Animalia
- Phylum: Arthropoda
- Class: Insecta
- Order: Lepidoptera
- Family: Geometridae
- Genus: Lophophelma
- Species: L. obtecta

Binomial name
- Lophophelma obtecta (Debauche, 1941)

Synonyms
- Terpna obtecta Debauche, 1941

Species of moth

Lophophelma obtecta is a moth of the family Geometridae first described by Hubert Robert Debauche in 1941. It is found on Sulawesi in Indonesia.
