= Neocalyptis magnilabis =

Scientific classification
- Domain: Eukaryota
- Kingdom: Animalia
- Phylum: Arthropoda
- Class: Insecta
- Order: Lepidoptera
- Family: Tortricidae
- Genus: Neocalyptis
- Species: N. magnilabis

Binomial name
- Neocalyptis magnilabis Razowski, 2009

Species of moth

Neocalyptis magnilabis is a moth of the family Tortricidae. It is found in Vietnam.

The wingspan is 15 mm.
