= Neocalyptis liratana =

Scientific classification
- Domain: Eukaryota
- Kingdom: Animalia
- Phylum: Arthropoda
- Class: Insecta
- Order: Lepidoptera
- Family: Tortricidae
- Genus: Neocalyptis
- Species: N. liratana

Binomial name
- Neocalyptis liratana (Christoph, 1881)

Synonyms
- Tortrix liratana Christoph, 1881

Species of moth

Neocalyptis liratana is a species of moth of the family Tortricidae. It is found in India (Assam), Russia (Amur) and Japan.

The wingspan is 13–22 mm.
