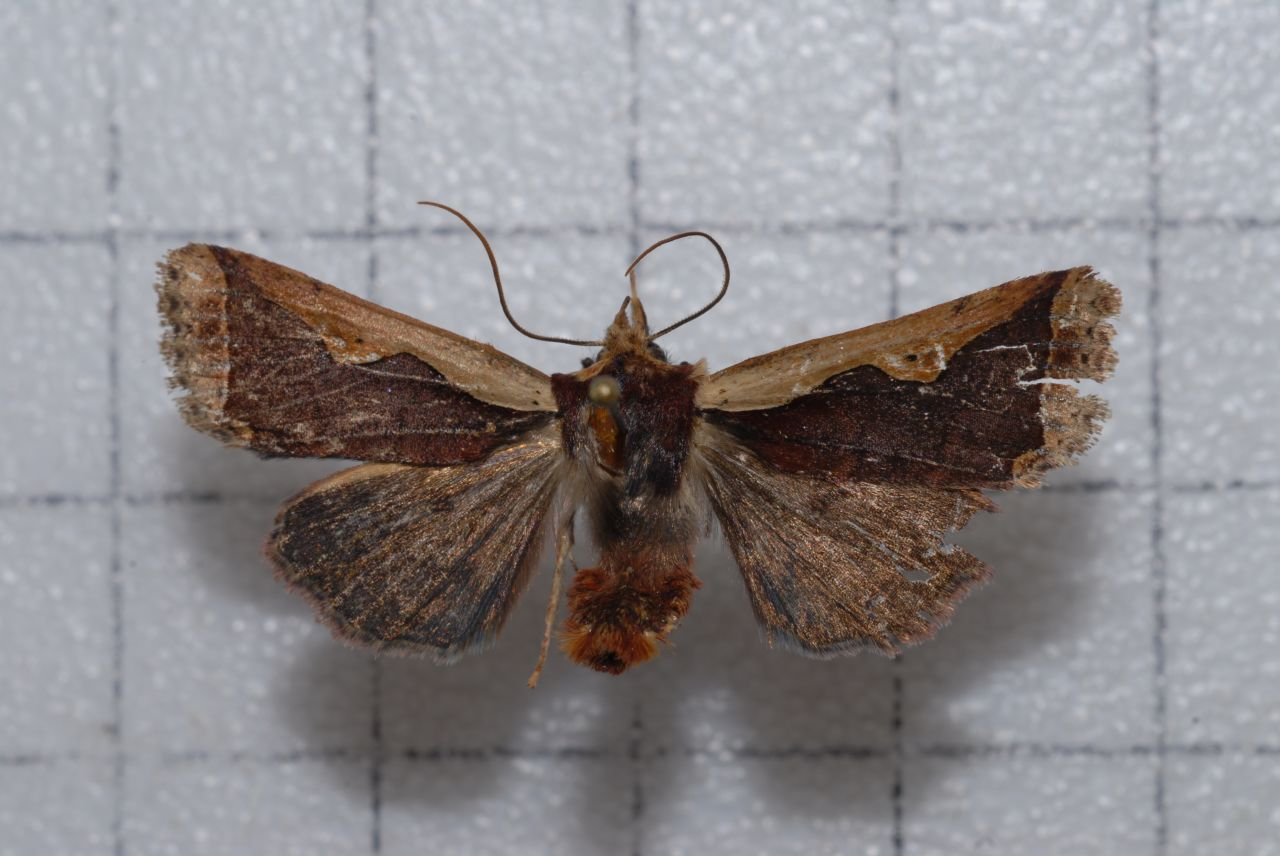

Scientific classification
- Kingdom: Animalia
- Phylum: Arthropoda
- Clade: Pancrustacea
- Class: Insecta
- Order: Lepidoptera
- Superfamily: Noctuoidea
- Family: Noctuidae
- Genus: Rhynchaglaea
- Species: R. hemixantha

Binomial name
- Rhynchaglaea hemixantha Sugi, 1980

= Rhynchaglaea hemixantha =

Species of moth

Rhynchaglaea hemixantha is a species of moth of the family Noctuidae. It is found in Taiwan.
