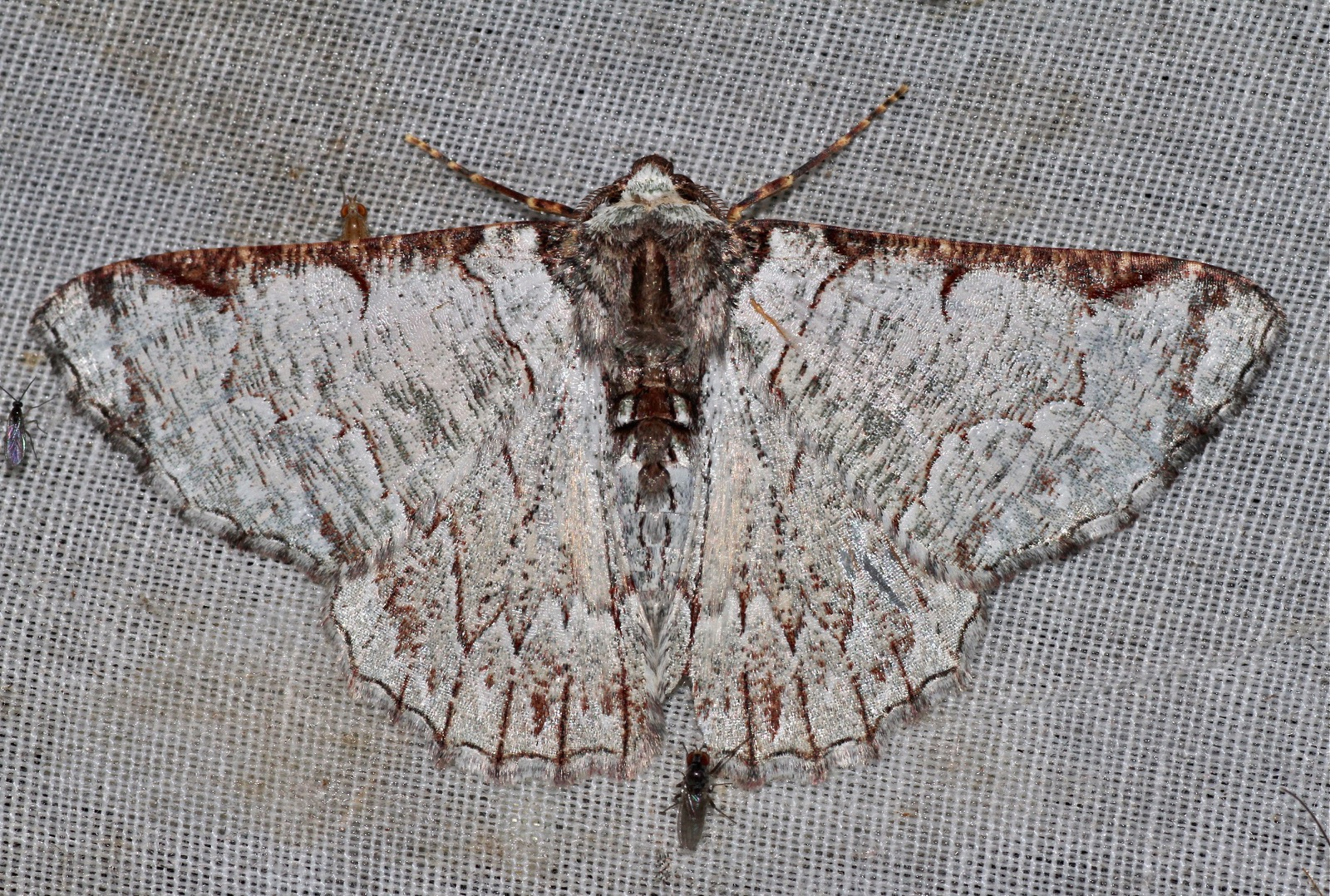

Scientific classification
- Kingdom: Animalia
- Phylum: Arthropoda
- Clade: Pancrustacea
- Class: Insecta
- Order: Lepidoptera
- Family: Geometridae
- Tribe: Pseudoterpnini
- Genus: Lophophelma; Prout, 1912

= Lophophelma =

Genus of moths

Lophophelma is a genus of moths in the family Geometridae described by Prout in 1912.

== Species ==
- Lophophelma albapex (Inoue, 1988)
- Lophophelma calaurops (Prout, 1912)
- Lophophelma costistrigaria (Moore, 1868)
- Lophophelma erionoma (Swinhoe, 1893)
  - Lophophelma erionoma erionoma (Swinhoe, 1893) (=Terpna furvirubens Prout, 1934)
  - Lophophelma erionoma albicomitata (Prout, 1927)
  - Lophophelma erionoma kiangsiensis (Chu, 1981)
  - Lophophelma erionoma subnubigosa (Prout, 1927) (=Terpna erionoma imitaria Sterneck, 1928)
- Lophophelma eucryphes (West, 1930)
- Lophophelma eupines (West, 1930)
- Lophophelma funebrosa (Warren, 1896)
  - Lophophelma funebrosa funebrosa (Warren, 1896)
  - Lophophelma funebrosa tenuilinea (Warren, 1899)
- Lophophelma iterans (Prout, 1926)
  - Lophophelma iterans iterans (Prout, 1926)
  - Lophophelma iterans onerosus (Inoue, 1970)
- Lophophelma loncheres (Prout, 1931)
- Lophophelma luteipes (Felder & Rogenhofer, 1875)
  - Lophophelma luteipes luteipes (Felder & Rogenhofer, 1875) (=Pingasa similis Moore, 1888)
  - Lophophelma luteipes enthusiastes (Prout, 1927)
- Lophophelma neonoma (Hampson, 1907)
- Lophophelma niveata (Debauche, 1941)
- Lophophelma obtecta (Debauche, 1941)
- Lophophelma pingbiana (Chu, 1981)
- Lophophelma rubroviridata (Warren, 1898)
- Lophophelma ruficosta (Hampson, 1891)
- Lophophelma taiwana (Wileman, 1912)
- Lophophelma varicoloraria (Moore, 1868)
- Lophophelma vigens (Butler, 1880)
  - Lophophelma vigens vigens (Butler, 1880)
  - Lophophelma vigens ruficoloraria (Warren, 1897)
