= Neocalyptis tricensa =

Scientific classification
- Domain: Eukaryota
- Kingdom: Animalia
- Phylum: Arthropoda
- Class: Insecta
- Order: Lepidoptera
- Family: Tortricidae
- Genus: Neocalyptis
- Species: N. tricensa

Binomial name
- Neocalyptis tricensa (Meyrick, 1912)

Synonyms
- Tortrix tricensa Meyrick, 1912

Species of moth

Neocalyptis tricensa is a moth of the family Tortricidae. It is found in Vietnam, India and Taiwan.
