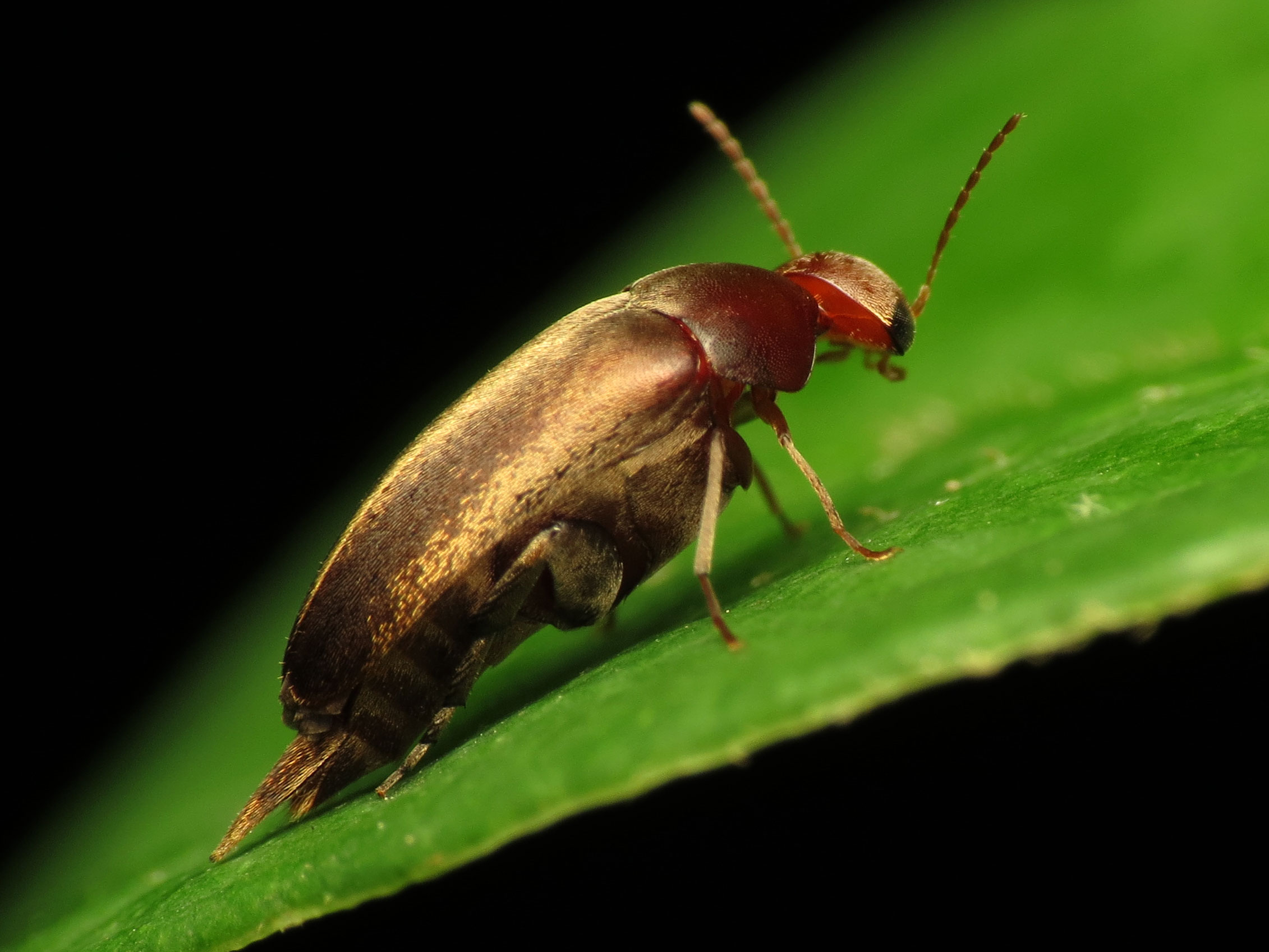
- Glipostenoda ambusta

Scientific classification
- Domain: Eukaryota
- Kingdom: Animalia
- Phylum: Arthropoda
- Class: Insecta
- Order: Coleoptera
- Suborder: Polyphaga
- Infraorder: Cucujiformia
- Family: Mordellidae
- Subfamily: Mordellinae
- Tribe: Mordellistenini
- Genus: Glipostenoda; Ermisch, 1950

Type species
- Glipostenoda castaneicolor Ermisch, 1950

= Glipostenoda =

Genus of beetles

Glipostenoda is a genus of tumbling flower beetles in the family Mordellidae. There are more than 25 described species in Glipostenoda.

== Species ==
These 28 species belong to the genus Glipostenoda:

- Glipostenoda ambusta (LeConte, 1862)
- Glipostenoda castaneicolor Ermisch, 1950
- Glipostenoda coleae (Champion, 1917)
- Glipostenoda degressa (Champion, 1917)
- Glipostenoda freyi Ermisch, 1962
- Glipostenoda guana Lu & Ivie, 1999
- Glipostenoda higashinoi Nomura, 1951
- Glipostenoda imadatei Chûjô, 1964
- Glipostenoda incognita Ermisch, 1962
- Glipostenoda kawasakii (Nomura, 1951)
- Glipostenoda kimotoi Chûjô, 1957
- Glipostenoda lineatisuturalis Nomura, 1967
- Glipostenoda mahena (Kolbe, 1910)
- Glipostenoda matsumurai (Kono, 1932)
- Glipostenoda mellissiana (Wollaston, 1870)
- Glipostenoda multilineata (Lea, 1917)
- Glipostenoda neocastanea Batten, 1990
- Glipostenoda nigrofusca Ermisch, 1968
- Glipostenoda pallida (Champion, 1896)
- Glipostenoda pseudexcisa Nomura, 1975
- Glipostenoda rarasana Nomura, 1951
- Glipostenoda rimogana Nomura, 1967
- Glipostenoda rosseola (Marseul, 1877)
- Glipostenoda shizuokana (Kono, 1935)
- Glipostenoda taiwana (Kono, 1934)
- Glipostenoda takashii Nomura, 1967
- Glipostenoda trichophora (Nomura, 1951)
- Glipostenoda yaeyamana Tsuru, 2021
