= Neocalyptis kimbaliana =

Scientific classification
- Kingdom: Animalia
- Phylum: Arthropoda
- Class: Insecta
- Order: Lepidoptera
- Family: Tortricidae
- Genus: Neocalyptis
- Species: N. kimbaliana

Binomial name
- Neocalyptis kimbaliana Razowski, 2005

Species of moth

Neocalyptis kimbaliana is a species of moth of the family Tortricidae. It is found on Borneo.
