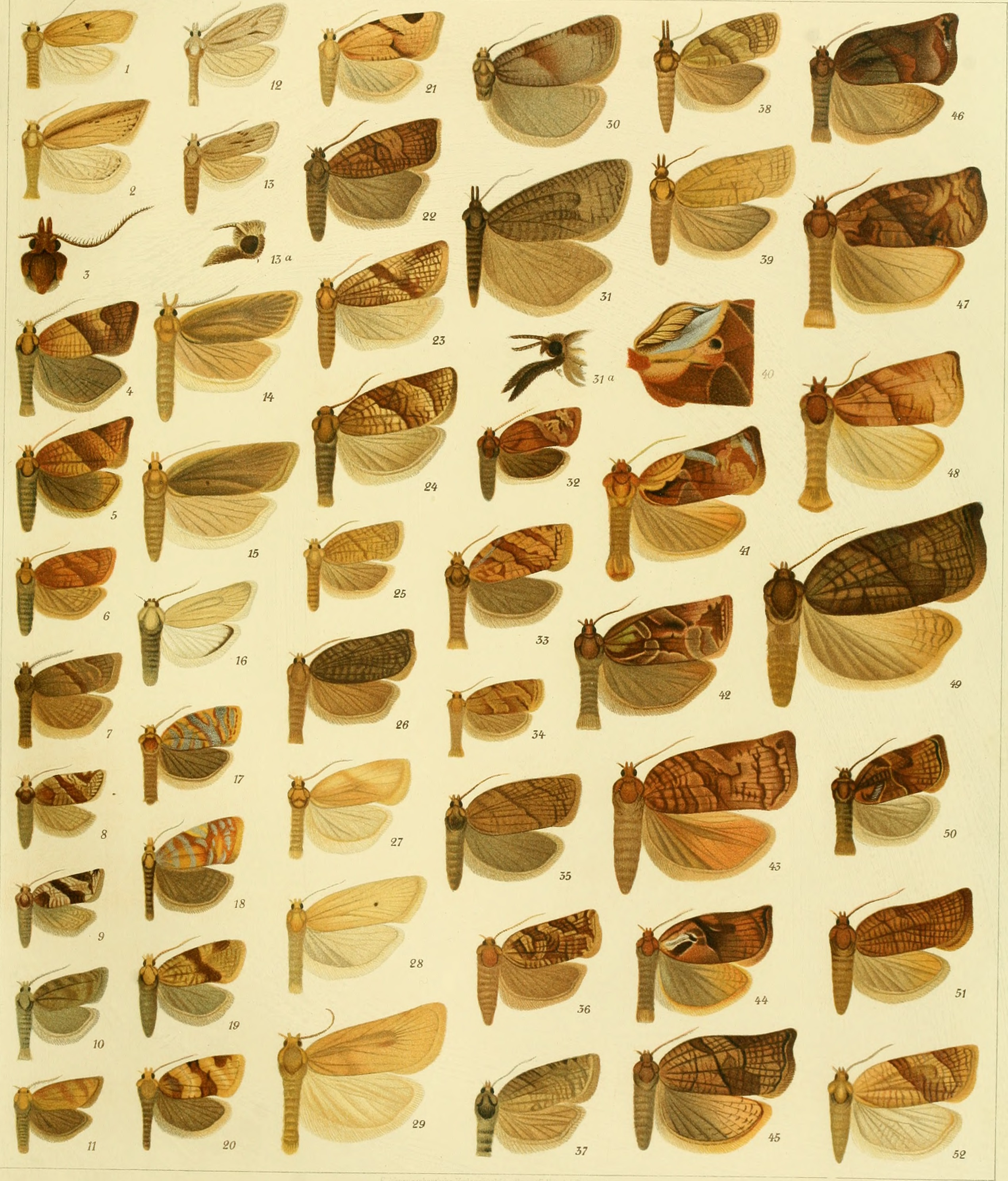
- Neocalyptis angustilineata in Kennel Die palaearktischen tortriciden figure 25 female

Scientific classification
- Domain: Eukaryota
- Kingdom: Animalia
- Phylum: Arthropoda
- Class: Insecta
- Order: Lepidoptera
- Family: Tortricidae
- Genus: Neocalyptis
- Species: N. angustilineata

Binomial name
- Neocalyptis angustilineata (Walsingham, 1900)

Synonyms
- Epagoge angustilineata Walsingham, 1900; Dichelia inconditana Kennel, 1901

= Neocalyptis angustilineata =

Species of moth

Neocalyptis angustilineata is a species of moth of the family Tortricidae. It is found in Japan, the Russian Far East and on the Korean Peninsula.

The wingspan is 12.5–16 mm.
