= Neocalyptis nexilis =

Scientific classification
- Kingdom: Animalia
- Phylum: Arthropoda
- Class: Insecta
- Order: Lepidoptera
- Family: Tortricidae
- Genus: Neocalyptis
- Species: N. nexilis

Binomial name
- Neocalyptis nexilis Razowski, 1984

Species of moth

Neocalyptis nexilis is a species of moth of the family Tortricidae. It is found in Jiangsu, China.
