= Lophophelma pingbiana =

Scientific classification
- Kingdom: Animalia
- Phylum: Arthropoda
- Class: Insecta
- Order: Lepidoptera
- Family: Geometridae
- Genus: Lophophelma
- Species: L. pingbiana

Binomial name
- Lophophelma pingbiana (Chu, 1981)

Synonyms
- Terpna pingbiana Chu, 1981

Species of moth

Lophophelma pingbiana is a moth of the family Geometridae first described by Chu in 1981. It is found in Yunnan, China.
