= Lophophelma loncheres =

Scientific classification
- Kingdom: Animalia
- Phylum: Arthropoda
- Class: Insecta
- Order: Lepidoptera
- Family: Geometridae
- Genus: Lophophelma
- Species: L. loncheres

Binomial name
- Lophophelma loncheres (L. B. Prout, 1931)

Synonyms
- Terpna loncheres Prout, 1931

Species of moth

Lophophelma loncheres is a moth of the family Geometridae. It was first described by Louis Beethoven Prout in 1931. It is found on Peninsular Malaysia, Sumatra and Borneo. The habitat consists of lowland forests.
