= Neocalyptis pigra =

Scientific classification
- Kingdom: Animalia
- Phylum: Arthropoda
- Class: Insecta
- Order: Lepidoptera
- Family: Tortricidae
- Genus: Neocalyptis
- Species: N. pigra

Binomial name
- Neocalyptis pigra (Meyrick, 1921)

Synonyms
- Capua pigra Meyrick, 1921

Species of moth

Neocalyptis pigra is a species of moth of the family Tortricidae. It is found on Java in Indonesia.
