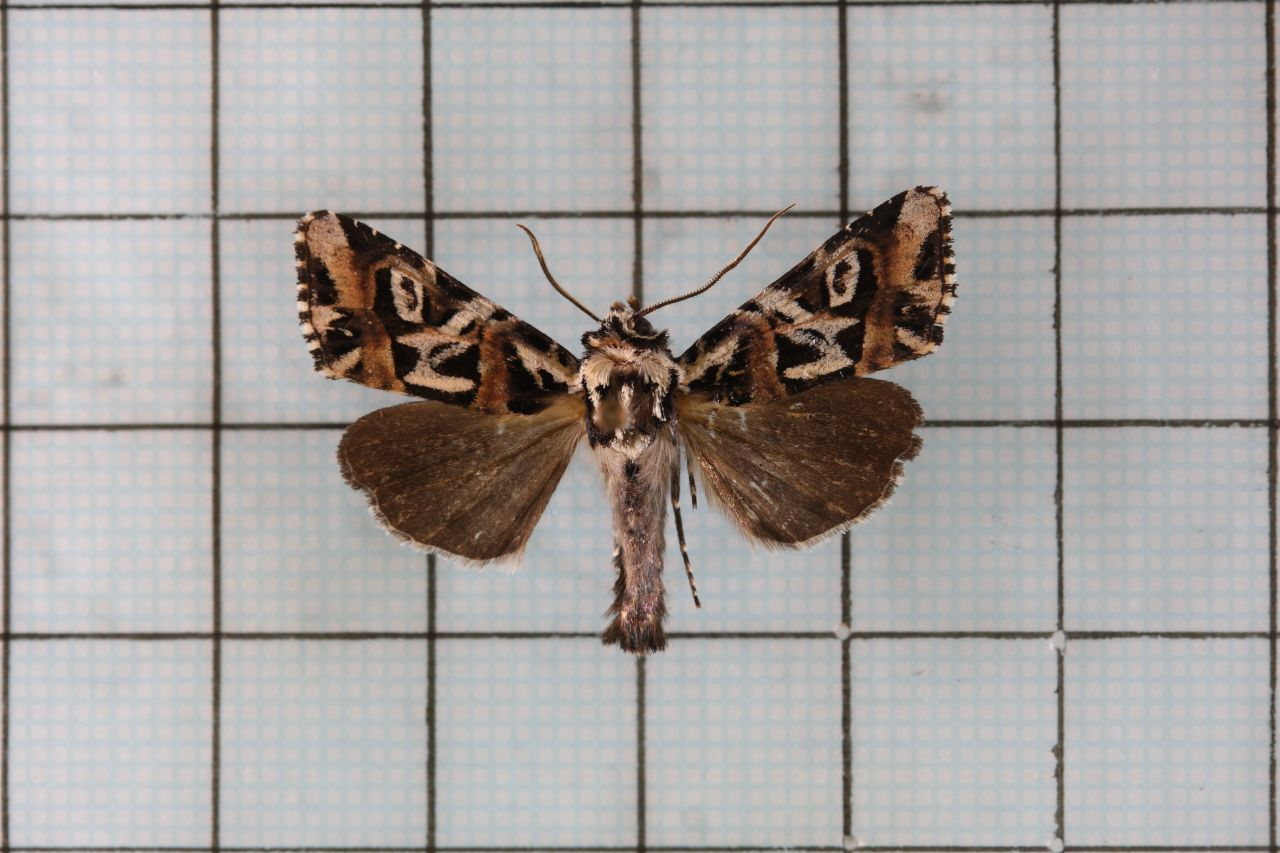

Scientific classification
- Kingdom: Animalia
- Phylum: Arthropoda
- Class: Insecta
- Order: Lepidoptera
- Superfamily: Noctuoidea
- Family: Noctuidae
- Genus: Chandata
- Species: C. taiwana

Binomial name
- Chandata taiwana Yoshimoto, 1982

= Chandata taiwana =

Species of moth

Chandata taiwana is a moth of the family Noctuidae. It is found in Taiwan.
