= Glipostenoda taiwana =

Scientific classification
- Kingdom: Animalia
- Phylum: Arthropoda
- Class: Insecta
- Order: Coleoptera
- Suborder: Polyphaga
- Infraorder: Cucujiformia
- Family: Mordellidae
- Genus: Glipostenoda
- Species: G. taiwana

Binomial name
- Glipostenoda taiwana (Kôno, 1934)

Synonyms
- Mordellistena taiwana Kôno, 1934

Species of beetle

Glipostenoda taiwana is a species of beetle in the genus Glipostenoda. It was described in 1934.
