= Dactylispa taiwana =

Scientific classification
- Kingdom: Animalia
- Phylum: Arthropoda
- Class: Insecta
- Order: Coleoptera
- Suborder: Polyphaga
- Infraorder: Cucujiformia
- Family: Chrysomelidae
- Genus: Dactylispa
- Species: D. taiwana

Binomial name
- Dactylispa taiwana Takizawa, 1978

Species of beetle

Dactylispa taiwana is a species of beetle of the family Chrysomelidae. It is found in Taiwan.

== Life history ==
The recorded host plants for this species are Carpinus kawakamii, Styrax suberifolia and Zelkova serrata.
