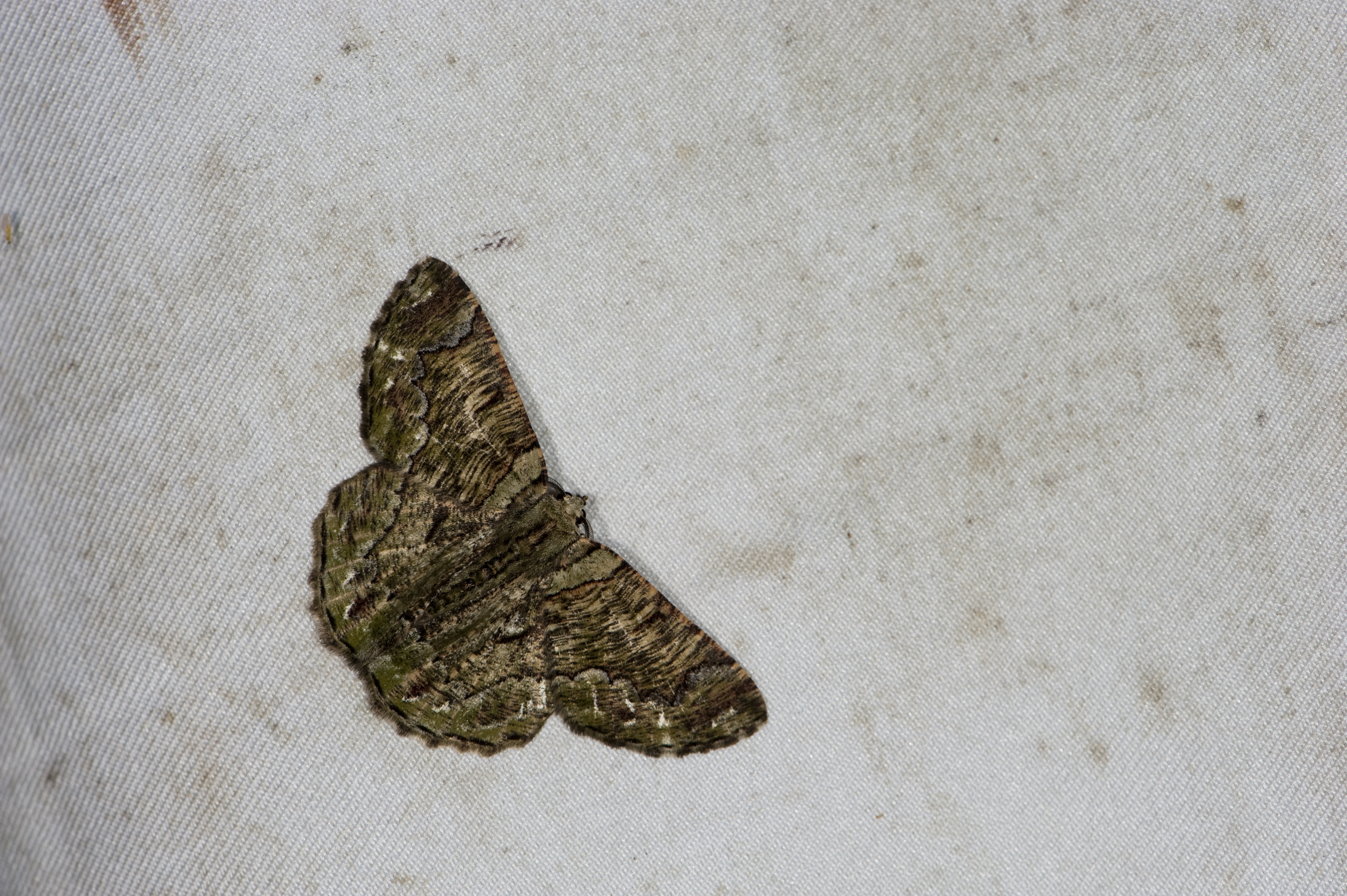

Scientific classification
- Kingdom: Animalia
- Phylum: Arthropoda
- Class: Insecta
- Order: Lepidoptera
- Family: Geometridae
- Genus: Lophophelma
- Species: L. taiwana

Binomial name
- Lophophelma taiwana (Wileman, 1912)

Synonyms
- Pachyodes taiwana Wileman, 1912; Terpna taiwana

= Lophophelma taiwana =

Species of moth

Lophophelma taiwana is a moth of the family Geometridae first described by Alfred Ernest Wileman in 1912. It is found in Taiwan.
