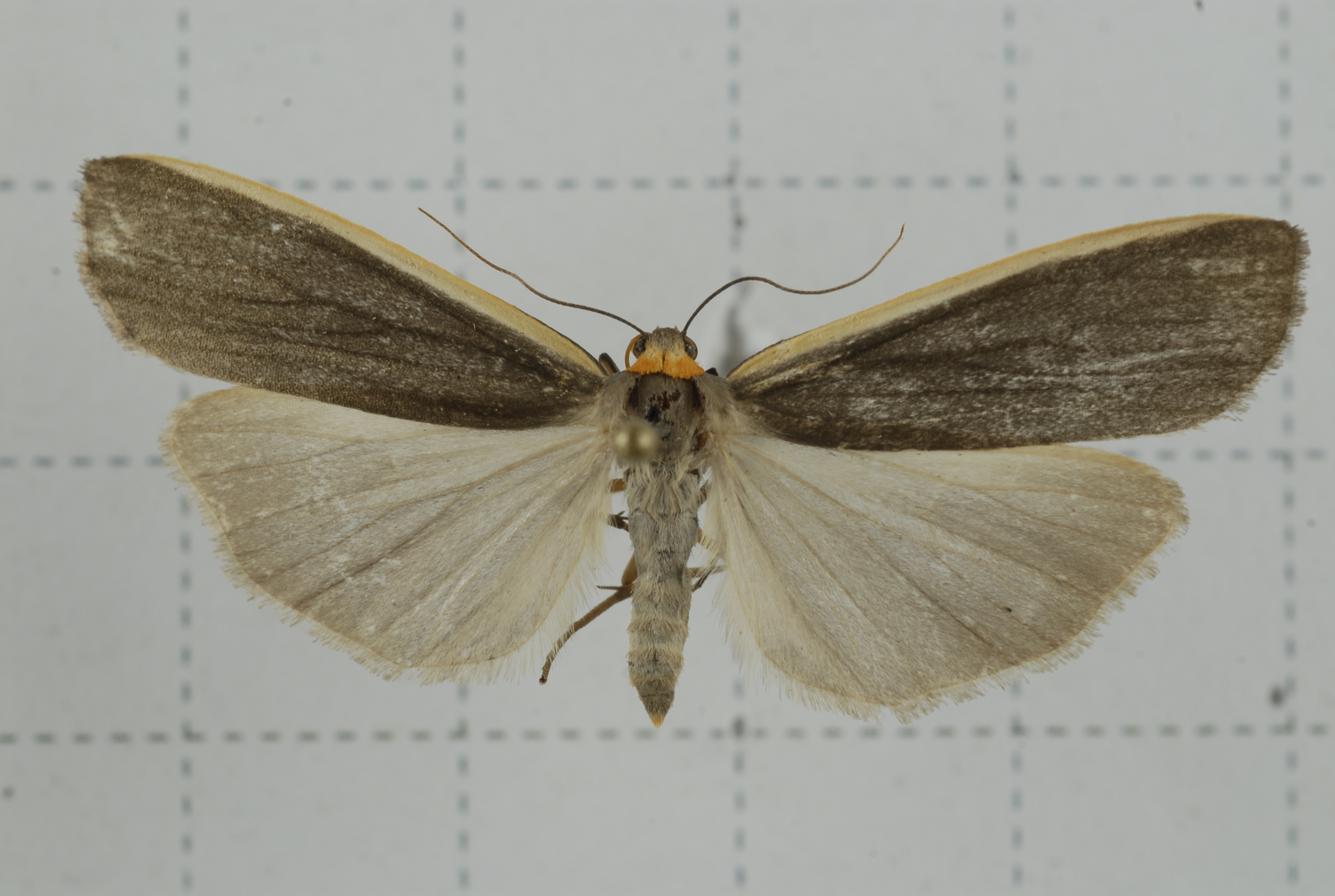

Scientific classification
- Kingdom: Animalia
- Phylum: Arthropoda
- Class: Insecta
- Order: Lepidoptera
- Superfamily: Noctuoidea
- Family: Erebidae
- Subfamily: Arctiinae
- Genus: Eilema
- Species: E. taiwana

Binomial name
- Eilema taiwana (Wileman, 1910)

Synonyms
- Ilema taiwana Wileman, 1910

= Eilema taiwana =

Species of moth

Eilema taiwana is a moth of the subfamily Arctiinae. It is found in Taiwan.
