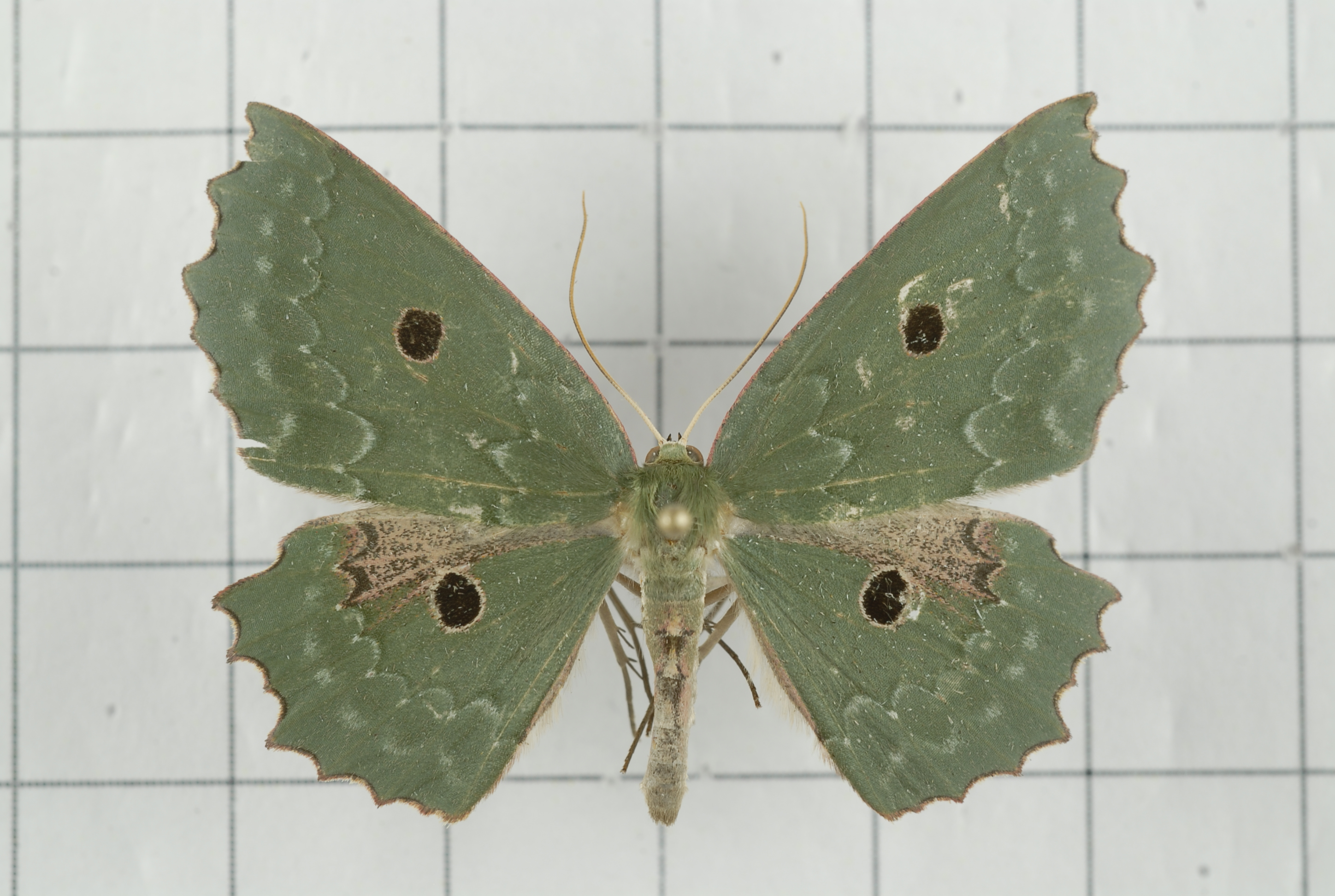

Scientific classification
- Kingdom: Animalia
- Phylum: Arthropoda
- Class: Insecta
- Order: Lepidoptera
- Family: Geometridae
- Genus: Chlorodontopera
- Species: C. taiwana

Binomial name
- Chlorodontopera taiwana (Wileman, 1911)

Synonyms
- Episothalma taiwana Wileman, 1911

= Chlorodontopera taiwana =

Species of moth

Chlorodontopera taiwana, commonly known as Taiwanese four-eyed green ruler moth, is a species of moth in the family Geometridae. It was first described by Alfred Ernest Wileman in 1911.

== Description ==
Its wingspan is 40–47 mm (1.6–1.9 in), the body is primarily grass green with black spots on the front and back of the abdomen. The outer edges of both wings contain tooth processes. All four wings have a black spot in the middle, the four "eyes" of its common name.

== Range ==
It is endemic to Taiwan.

== Habitat ==
Mid-low altitude forests, adults most common in spring and summer.
