= Dichomeris taiwana =

Scientific classification
- Kingdom: Animalia
- Phylum: Arthropoda
- Class: Insecta
- Order: Lepidoptera
- Family: Gelechiidae
- Genus: Dichomeris
- Species: D. taiwana

Binomial name
- Dichomeris taiwana Park & Hodges, 1995

Species of moth

Dichomeris taiwana is a moth in the family Gelechiidae. It was described by Kyu-Tek Park and Ronald W. Hodges in 1995. It is found in Taiwan.

The length of the forewings is 6.5–7.2 mm.
