= Neocalyptis taiwana =

Scientific classification
- Kingdom: Animalia
- Phylum: Arthropoda
- Class: Insecta
- Order: Lepidoptera
- Family: Tortricidae
- Genus: Neocalyptis
- Species: N. taiwana

Binomial name
- Neocalyptis taiwana Razowski, 2000

Species of moth

Neocalyptis taiwana is a moth of the family Tortricidae. It is found in Taiwan.

The wingspan is 12 mm. The ground colour of the forewings is brownish yellow, but the tegula are browner. The hindwings are brownish grey, but paler basally. Adults are on wing in mid-May.
