= Maladera taiwana =

Scientific classification
- Kingdom: Animalia
- Phylum: Arthropoda
- Class: Insecta
- Order: Coleoptera
- Suborder: Polyphaga
- Infraorder: Scarabaeiformia
- Family: Scarabaeidae
- Genus: Maladera
- Species: M. taiwana

Binomial name
- Maladera taiwana Nomura, 1974

Species of beetle

Maladera taiwana is a species of beetle of the family Scarabaeidae. It is found in China (Fujian, Guangdong, Guangxi, Yunnan), Taiwan, Laos, Thailand and Vietnam.

== Description ==
Adults reach a length of about 6.8 mm. They have a reddish brown, oblong body. The dorsal surface is mostly dull (but the labroclypeus, tarsi, and tibiae are shiny) and, except for the setae along the lateral margins of the pronotum and elytra, nearly glabrous.
