= Chlorodontopera chalybeata =

Scientific classification
- Domain: Eukaryota
- Kingdom: Animalia
- Phylum: Arthropoda
- Class: Insecta
- Order: Lepidoptera
- Family: Geometridae
- Genus: Chlorodontopera
- Species: C. chalybeata

Binomial name
- Chlorodontopera chalybeata (Moore, 1872)

Synonyms
- Odontopera chalybeata Moore, 1872

Species of moth

Chlorodontopera chalybeata is a species of moth in the family Geometridae. It is found in the north-eastern Himalayas, Myanmar, northern Vietnam, Borneo, and Sumatra.

== Description ==
Palpi oblique, second joint thickly scaled and reaching beyond the frons. Abdomen with dorsal tufts. Wings with outer margin crenulate (scalloped). Forewings with veins 7, 8, 9 and 10 stalked. Vein 11 anastomosing (fusing) with vein 12, and then with vein 10. Hindwings with produced margin to points at vein 4 and usually at vein 6.
