= TSRI =

TSRI may refer to:

- Taiwan Semiconductor Research Institute
- The Scripps Research Institute, former name for Scripps Research
