= Taipei-1 (supercomputer) =

Supercomputer of Taiwan

Design
- Manufacturer: Nvidia
- Release date: 2023

System
- Operating system: Ubuntu 22.04
- CPU: Intel Xeon Platinum 8480C 56C 2GHz
- FLOPS: 34.53 PFlop/s (Theoretical Peak)

Taipei-1 is a supercomputer in Taiwan Kaohsiung Software Park owned by Nvidia. Taipei-1 is ranked 38th in the TOP500 released in June 2024. Taipei-1 supercomputer 25% of its computing power will be allocated to academia and 75% for commercial use.

== Technical specifications ==
- Cores: 40,960
- Linpack performance: 22.30 PFlop/s
- Theoretical peak: 34.53 PFlop/s

== See also ==
- Semiconductor industry in Taiwan
- Supercomputing in Taiwan
- Taiwania (supercomputer)
