= Ocean Researcher V =

Research vessel sunk in 2014 during Typhoon Vongfong

Coordinates: 23.5667°N 119.7333°E

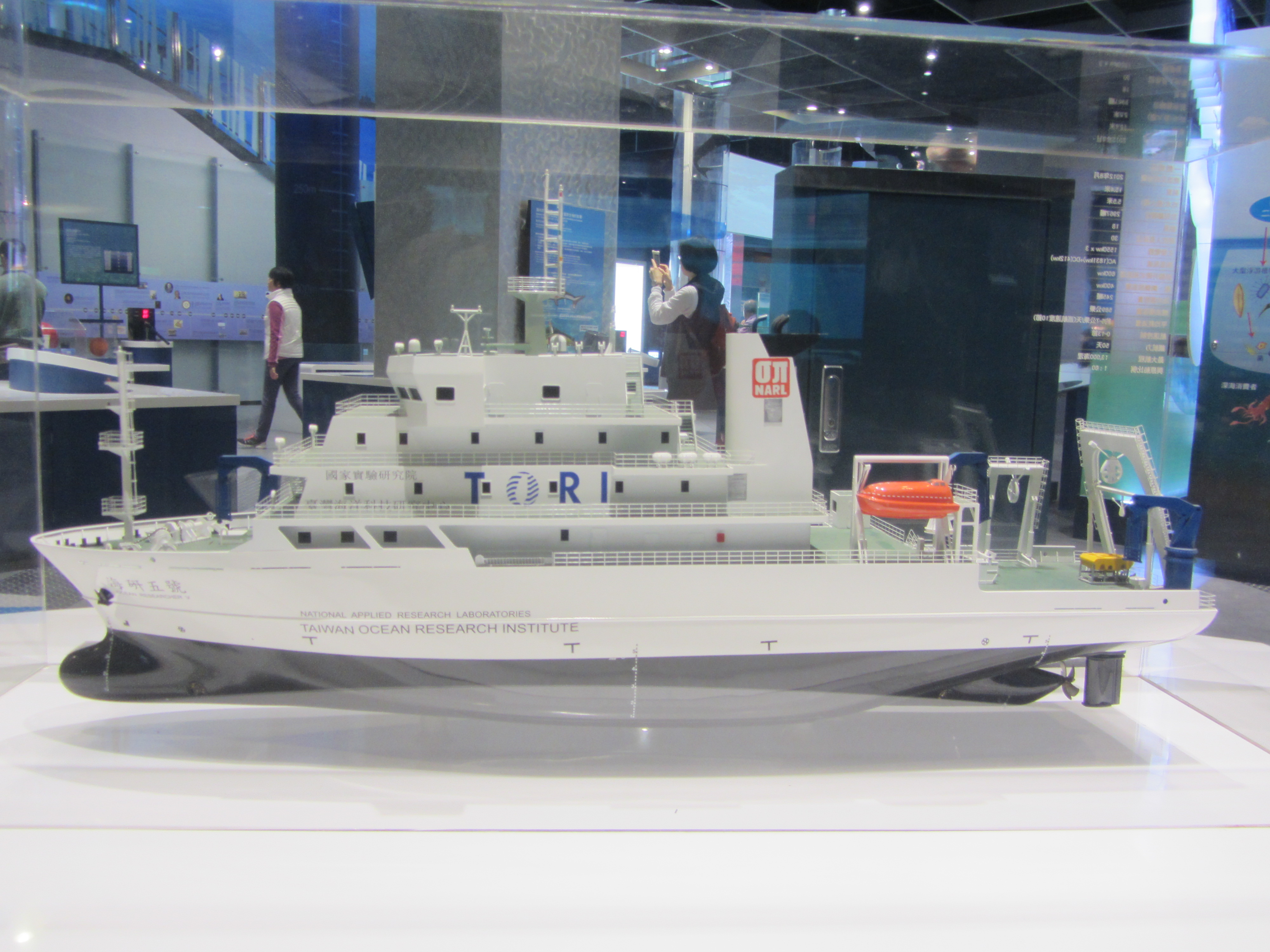
- A model of the Ocean Researcher V.

History
- Name: Ocean Researcher V
- Owner: Taiwan Ocean Research Institute
- Port of registry: Kaohsiung, Taiwan
- Ordered: 2012
- Builder: Jong Shyn Shipbuilding Co. Ltd, Taiwan
- Cost: NT$1.46 billion
- Yard number: J191
- Launched: August 2012
- Identification: IMO number: 9614098; MMSI number: 416461000; Call sign: BDCP
- Status: Total loss

General characteristics
- Type: Research vessel
- Tonnage: 2,967 GT; 1,060 DWT
- Length: 72.60 m (238 ft)
- Beam: 15.40 m (51 ft)
- Draught: 5.10 m (17 ft)
- Depth: 8.00 m (26 ft)
- Installed power: 3 × generators
- Propulsion: Diesel-electric; single shaft; 1 × AC propulsion motor; 1 × DC propulsion motor; 1 × fixed pitch propeller; 1 × bow thruster; 1 × drop-down azimuth bow thruster; 1 × stern thruster
- Speed: 10 knots (19 km/h; 12 mph) (service); 12 knots (22 km/h; 14 mph) (max)
- Crew: 18 crew; 30 scientists

RV Ocean Researcher V (traditional Chinese: 海研五號; simplified Chinese: 海研五号; pinyin: Hǎiyán Wǔ Hào) was a research vessel owned by the Taiwan Ocean Research Institute that sank off the coast of Penghu, Taiwan in 2014.

== History ==
At a cost of NT$1.46 billion (US$48 million), the Ocean Researcher V was built by Jong Shyn Shipbuilding Company, Kaohsiung, and launched in August 2012 for the Taiwan Ocean Research Institute, part of the National Applied Research Laboratories under the Ministry of Science and Technology.

== Sinking ==
Location of the wreck of the RV Ocean Researcher V

On 9 October 2014 the ship departed from Anping Harbor in Anping District, Tainan for an eight-day cruise researching pollutants in the atmosphere and how they propagate. Those aboard included researchers from the Academia Sinica, Taiwan Typhoon and Flood Research Institute, graduate students from National Taiwan Ocean University, National Yang Ming University, National Yunlin University of Science and Technology and National Cheng Kung University.

On the evening of 10 October 2014, due to Typhoon Vongfong, the ship ran onto a reef off the Penghu Islands. The ship listed and began to take on water, sinking at 8:11 pm. Most of the occupants boarded life-rafts to await rescue.

=== Rescue operations ===
Eight rescue helicopters, two C-130 transport planes, four navy frigates and five patrol boats were sent to the accident scene.

=== Casualties ===
One researcher was pronounced dead upon arrival at hospital and another died when attempts to resuscitate him failed.

== See also ==
- Transportation in Taiwan
