= Taiwania 3 =

Supercomputer of Taiwan

Taiwania 3 台灣杉三號
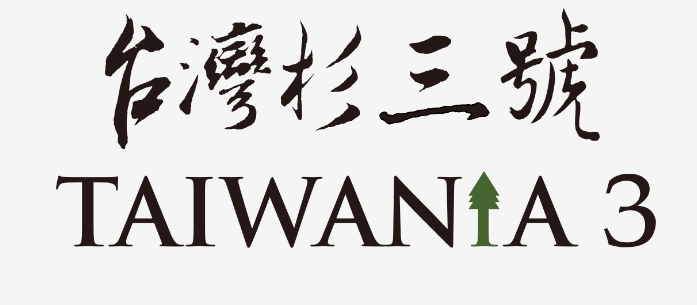

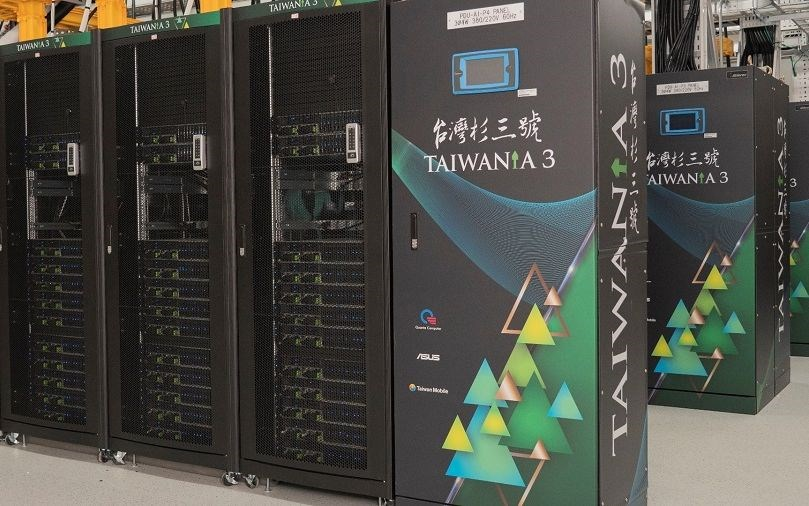
- Taiwania 3
- Date invented: November of 2020
- Invented by: National Center for High-performance Computing
- Inventor Type: National Agency
- Manufacturer: Taiwan Fixed Network, Quanta Computer, ASUS Cloud, NARLabs
- Introduced: November of 2020
- Type: Supercomputer
- Processor: Intel Xeon Platinum 8280 CPU
- Frequency: 2.4GHz
- Memory: 172800GB main
- Slots: 24 slots per node
- Connection: NVIDIA Mellanox Interconnection
- Ports: 4 ports / node
- Power consumption: 165 warts per node
- Speed: 2.7 quadrillion FLOPS

Taiwania 3 (Chinese: 台灣杉三號) is one of the supercomputers made by Taiwan, and also the newest one (August, 2021). It is placed in the National Center for High-performance Computing of NARLabs. There are 50,400 cores in total with 900 nodes, using Intel Xeon Platinum 8280 2.4 GHz CPU (28 Cores/CPU) and using CentOS as Operating System. It is an open access for public supercomputer. It is currently open access to scientists and more to do specific research after getting permission from Taiwan's National Center for High-performance Computing. This is the third supercomputer of the Taiwania series. It uses CentOS x86_64 7.8 as its system operator and Slurm Workload Manager as workflow manager to ensure better performance. Taiwania 3 uses InfiniBand HDR100 100 Gbit/s high speed Internet connection to ensure better performance of the supercomputer. The main memory capability is 192 GB. There's currently two Intel Xeon Platinum 8280 2.4 GHz CPU (28 Cores/CPU) inside each node. The full calculation capability is 2.7PFLOPS. It is launched into operation in November 2020 before schedule due to the needed for COVID-19. It is currently ranked number 227 on Top 500 list of June, 2021 and number 80 on Green 500 list. It is manufactured by Quanta Computer, Taiwan Fixed Network, and ASUS Cloud.

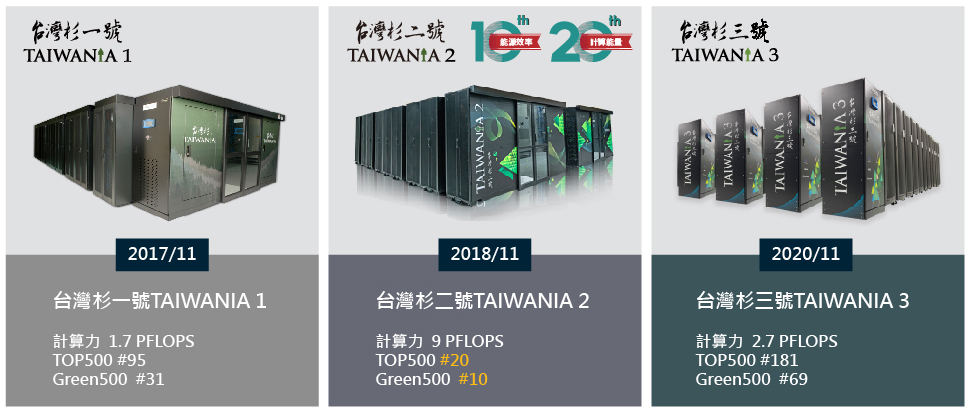
Image file describing Taiwania series of NCHC

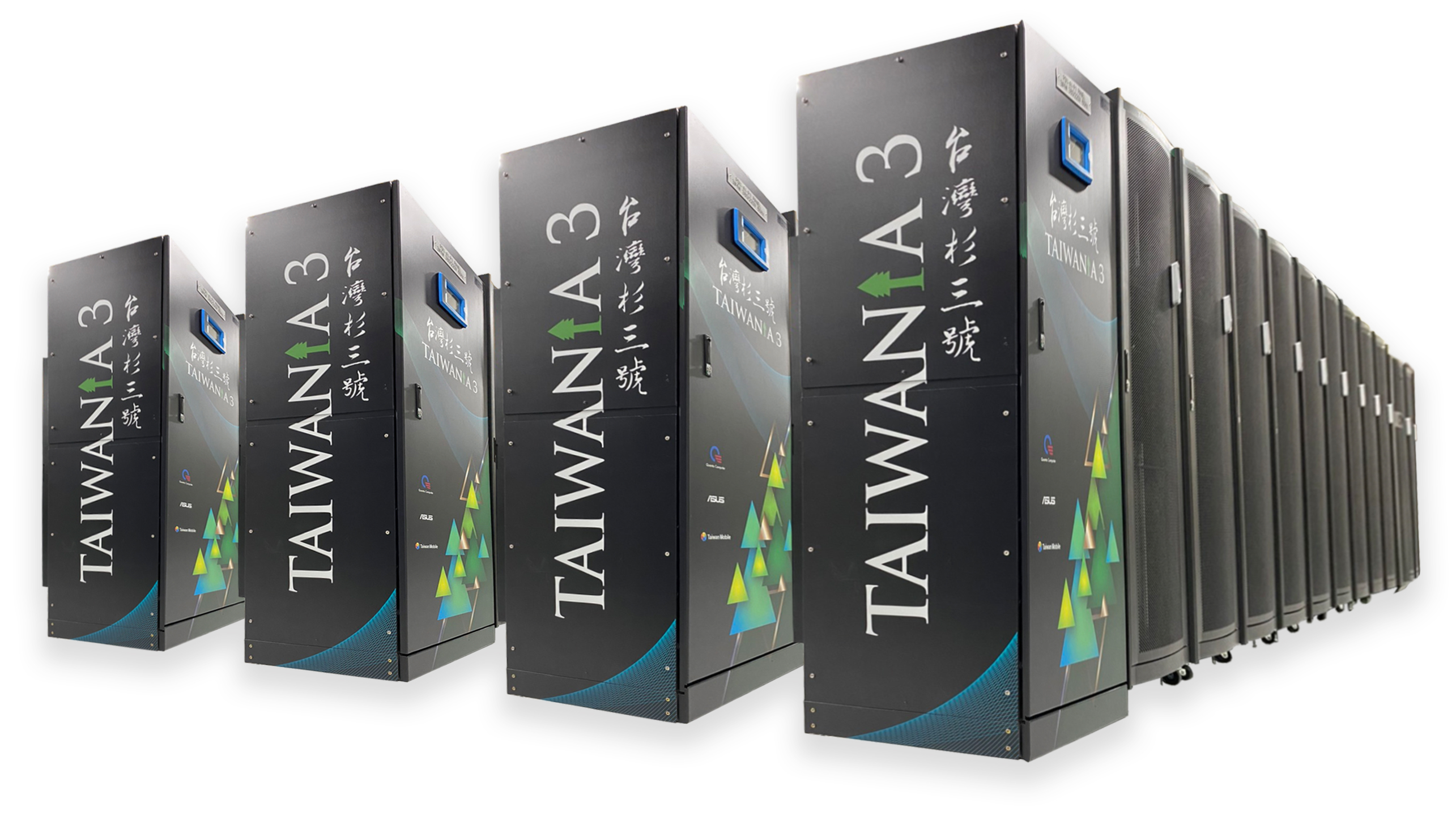
This picture is Taiwania 3 shot by NARLabs of Taiwan.

== Capability and specifications ==
This supercomputer's Rmax is 2297.6 TFLOPS, with Rpeak at 4354.6 TFLOPS and Nmax at 4,354,560, costing 563.85 kW. The housing is mainly designed and manufactured by ASUS Cloud, owned by Taiwan government which has experiences on constructing supercomputer housing and storage device housing The hardware is provided by Quanta Computer, which mainly manufactures servers.

=== Software ===
Software details are listed below (all data are according to Top 500 and NCHC):

- Operating system : CentOS x86_64 7.8
- Workload manager : Slurm Workload Manager
- Compiler : Intel Parallel Studio XE Composer Edition for Fortran and C++ Linux 2020 Update 4
- Math library : Intel Math Kernel Library for Linux 2020 Update 4
- MPI : Intel MPI Library for Linux 2019 Update 9

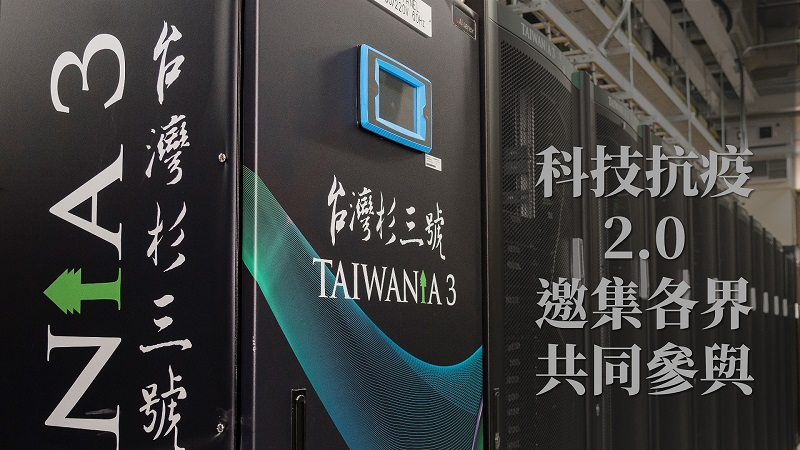
Taiwania 3 of Taiwan join Tech V 2.0

=== Hardware ===
Hardware details are listed below (all data are according to Top 500 and NCHC):

- CPU : Intel Xeon Platinum 8280 2.4 GHz CPU (28 Cores/CPU)
- Main memory : 192 GB/node (172800 GB total)
- Interconnection : NVIDIA Mellanox InfiniBand HDR100

Hardware basically uses :
QuantaPlex T42D-2U (4-Node) _{Dense Memory Multi-node Compute Server}
manufactured by Quanta Computer.
Operating temperature: 5 °C to 35 °C (41 °F to 95 °F), operating relative humidity: 20% to 85%RH. It has two processors per node.
The Intel Xeon CPU and memory mentioned above is inside it.

=== Speed ===
Speed details are listed below.

- R_{peak} : 4354.6 TeraFLOPS
- R_{max} : 2297.6 TeraFLOPS

P.S. This machine relies on CPU to calculate.

== Accessibility ==
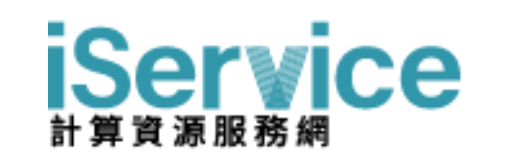
This is the logo of iService

Taiwania series have always been available for everybody access through iService and pay according to their requested time and CPUs and GPUs.

=== Films involved ===
Seqalu movie was filmed in collaboration with TWCC, a national service provided by Taiwan. TWCC includes enormous calculation resource provided by Taiwania supercomputer series. Taiwania 3 is one of the resource providers of the film. The programmers at National Centers for High-performance Computing of Taiwan designed the algorithms used in the simulations such as arrows and guns firing.

=== Taiwanese Environment Evaluation Contributions ===
The system operates under NCHC, NARLabs, which means it is part of the Taiwanese government. It contributes to the federal analytics by assisting on combining the information generated by the miscellaneous equipment all around Taiwan. It also help via combining the LIDAR, visual camera, DSM, and more together to form a map during disasters. Moreover, it constructs 3D visualizations for the Taiwanese government along with other supercomputers to assist on rescue, research, training, decision making, mapping, and more.

=== Biology and medication ===
Taiwania 3 is a supercomputer aimed to help the biomedical development. Taiwania 3 supercomputer was meant to help scientists find a solution to the COVID-19 pandemic. It has also been connected to the Taiwanese biological laboratories and their data base. The laboratories must reach a certain level in order to make contact with the system.

Taiwania 3 supercomputer renting price calculation

== History ==
=== 2019 ===
In 2019, the NCHC started project on Taiwania 3 construction...

=== 2020 ===
- November 2020
  Taiwania 3 supercomputer launched officially by NCHC.
- November 2020
  Taiwania 3 supercomputer joins COVID-19 research

=== 2021 ===
- May 2021
  outbreak of COVID-19 in Taiwan started
- June 2021
  Taiwania 3 grandly activates officially.
- July 3 of 2021
  Tech V2.0 Coronavirus project last registration date.
  note that the deadline has been moved to 8/31
- September 2021
  unveiled collaboration to film Seqalu.

== Architecture ==
Taiwania 3 Supercomputer is a CPU-based supercomputer, with about fifty thousand cores of Intel Xeon CPUs. This supercomputer uses Linux as OS, just like any other Top 500 supercomputers. More information about supercomputer architecture, visit here!

=== Comparison with other Taiwania supercomputers ===
Taiwania series is a family of supercomputers made by Taiwan during 21st century.

Taiwania 2 supercomputer, a GPU machine also made by the NCHC of Taiwan, has a capability of 9 PetaFLOPS, nearly 4 times greater compared with the 2.2 ~ 2.7 PetaFLOPS of Taiwania 3 (which uses mainly CPUs, just like Taiwania 1). The main difference between Taiwania 2 and 3 are the main calculators and objectives. Taiwania 2 is a GPU machine learning usage supercomputer, whereas Taiwania 3 is a CPU computing device for general scientific research usage. They are very different from head to toe.

Compare with Taiwania 2, Taiwania 3 is more alike with the Taiwania 1 supercomputer also of Taiwan. They both uses CPU architecture and are both more open access to the public (August, 2021). These two supercomputers both uses Intel CPUs to perform calculations. Their main difference is the capacity of the two supercomputers. These three supercomputers are all currently part of iService systems and partially TWCC computing systems, though Taiwania 3 was to replace Taiwania 1. The new replacement will be Taiwania 4, a CPU HPC which will replace the retiring Taiwania 1 when finished.

Taiwania 3 is a CPU supercomputer made by Taiwan. It has total capacity of 2.2 PetaFLOPS according to NCHC of Taiwan. It is a 21st-century HPC, meaning that it uses "Multitasking" to perform high performance computations. Other than using NVIDIA GPUs to boost capacity, this system uses Intel Xeon CPUs to calculate, making it closer to our regular life programming (but still a little bit different). Because it's using CPUs, the overall capacity on Machine learning is not as good as NVIDIA GPU Machine learning systems.

== See also ==
- Supercomputing in Taiwan
- Taiwania (supercomputer)
- Supercomputers
- Computer cluster
- Xeon
