= Taiwan Ocean Research Institute =

Marine Research Institute

- 台灣海洋科技研究中心
- Established: 2008
- Research type: Marine sciences and marine engineering
- Location: No. 196, Henan 2nd Road, Cianjin, Kaohsiung, Taiwan
- Website: www.tori.niar.org.tw

The Taiwan Ocean Research Institute (TORI; Chinese: 台灣海洋科技研究中心; pinyin: Táiwān Hǎiyáng Kējì Yánjiū Zhōngxīn) is the national marine science and technology institute of Taiwan. TORI is part of the National Applied Research Laboratories under the auspices of the Ministry of Science and Technology (Taiwan).

== History ==
TORI was founded in 2008 to increase collaboration with international research institutes and build on Taiwan's legacy of oceanographic research. TORI is participating in the development of the first domestic Taiwanese AUV.

In 2018 the research vessel Legend conducted a number of meteorological and hydrological surveys in the South China Sea.

In 2019 TORI organized the Underwater Technology 19 (UT19) conference in Kaohsiung, the conference was hosted by National Sun Yat-sen University.

== Vessels ==
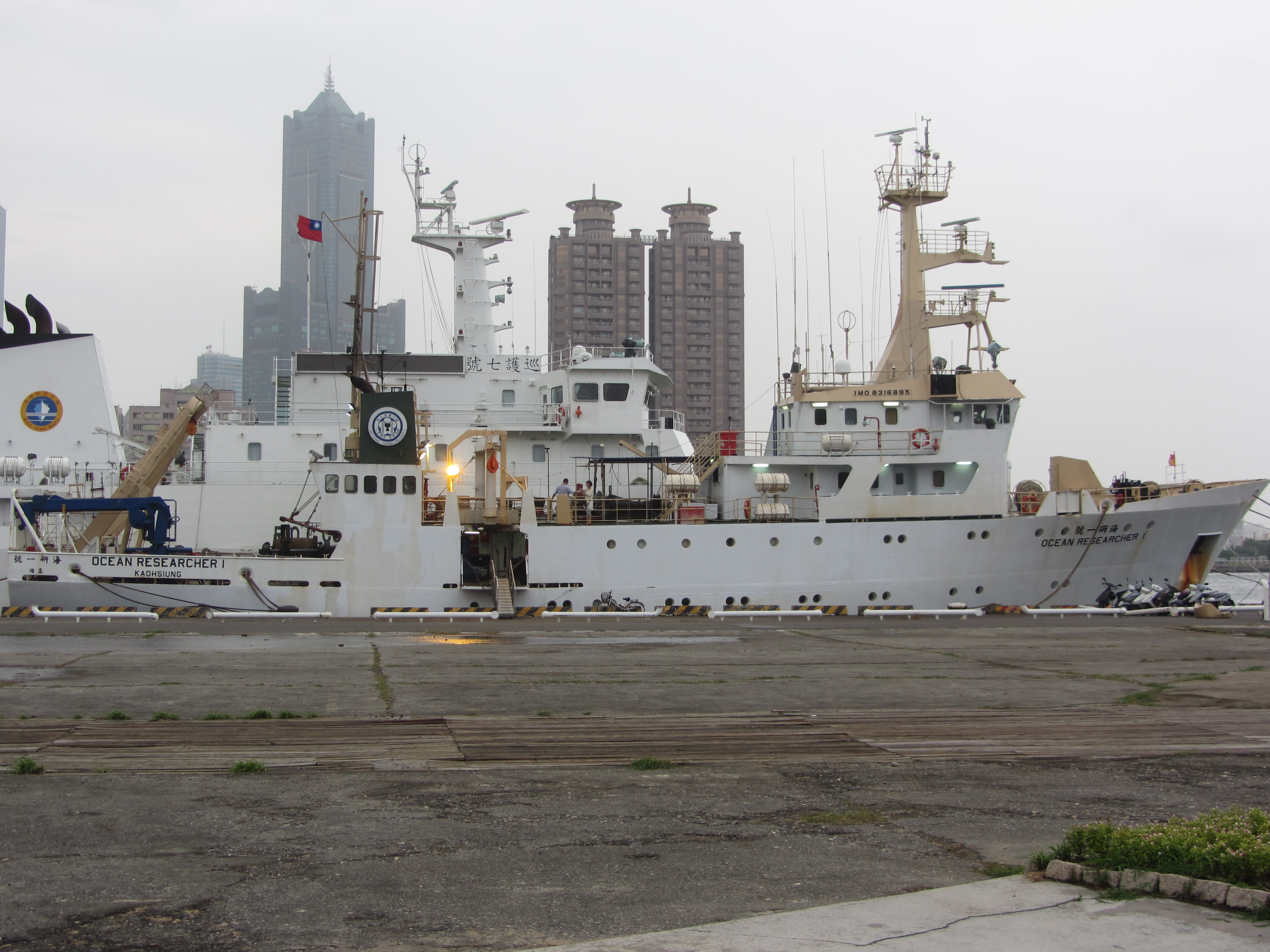
Ocean Researcher 1

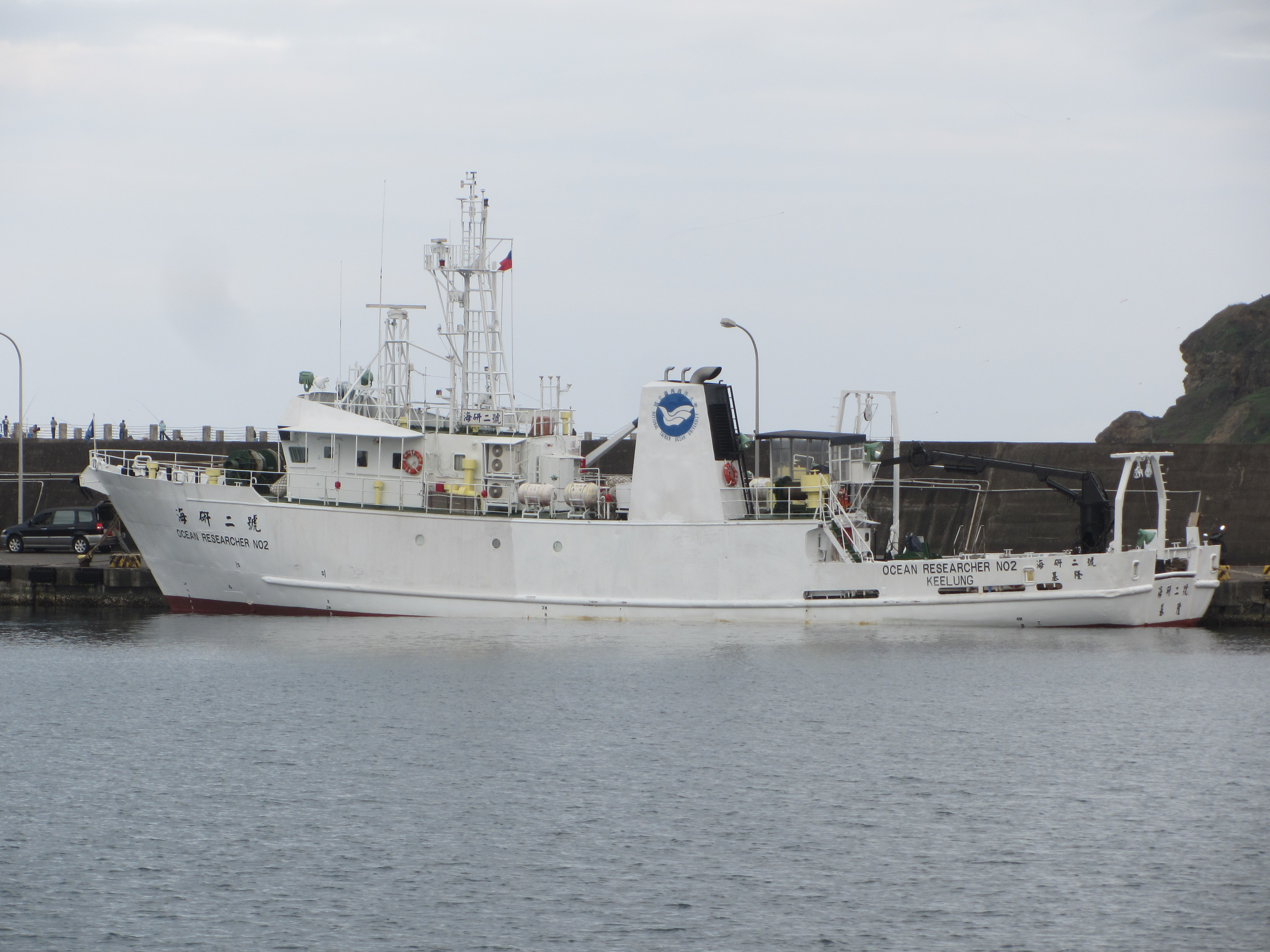
Ocean Researcher 2

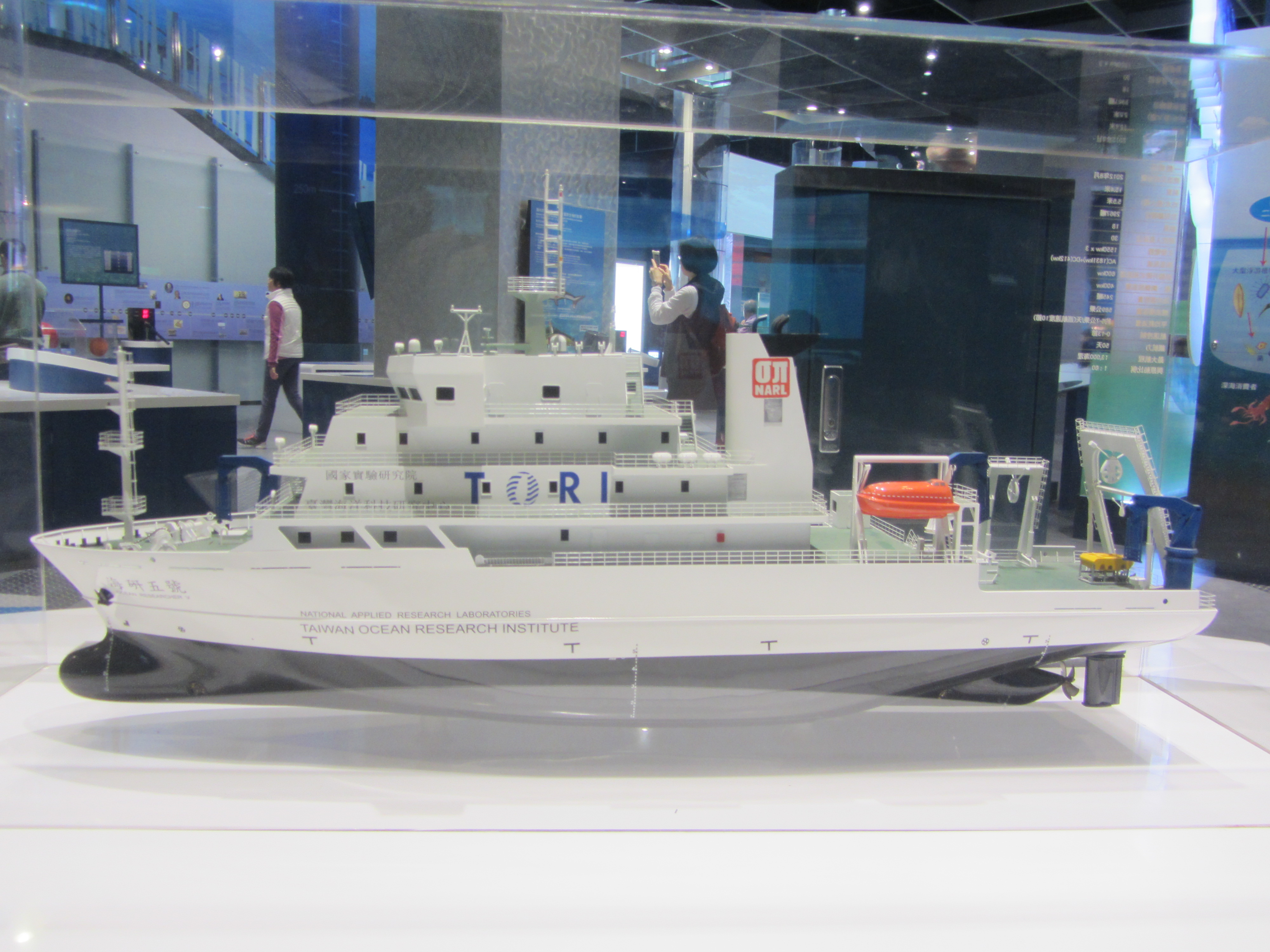
The Model of RV Ocean Researcher 5 Preserved in NMMST

In 2018 CSBC Corporation, Taiwan held a steel cutting ceremony for the third of three new ocean research vessels for TORI. The vessels are intended to enhance Taiwan's whole-of-ocean observation capability. The three vessels, one 1000-ton and two 500-ton, are expected to be delivered in June 2019.

=== Ocean R/V I ===
794-tonne research vessel, operated by National Taiwan University.

=== Ocean R/V II ===
294-tonne research vessel, operated by National Taiwan Ocean University.

=== Ocean R/V III ===
295-tonne research vessel, operated by National Sun Yat-sen University.

=== Ocean R/V V ===
Ocean Researcher V was a 2,700 research vessel which sank off the Penghu Islands in 2014 during Typhoon Vongfong.

=== New Ocean R/V I ===
Launched in 2020.

=== Legend (勵進) ===
Legend is a 2,629-ton research vessel with a crew of 19 that can accommodate up to 24 researchers. She was built in Vietnam by Singapore's Triyards Marine Services (TMS) at a cost of NTD870 million and features a hybrid-electric propulsion system. The ship was officially starting service on May 23, 2018.

== Equipment ==
TORI operates an Iver2 AUV system acquired in 2010.

== See also ==
- Ocean Affairs Council
- National Academy of Marine Research
- Maritime industries of Taiwan
