= Kaohsiung Software Park =

Business park in Kaohsiung, Taiwan

Kaohsiung Software Park 高雄軟體園區
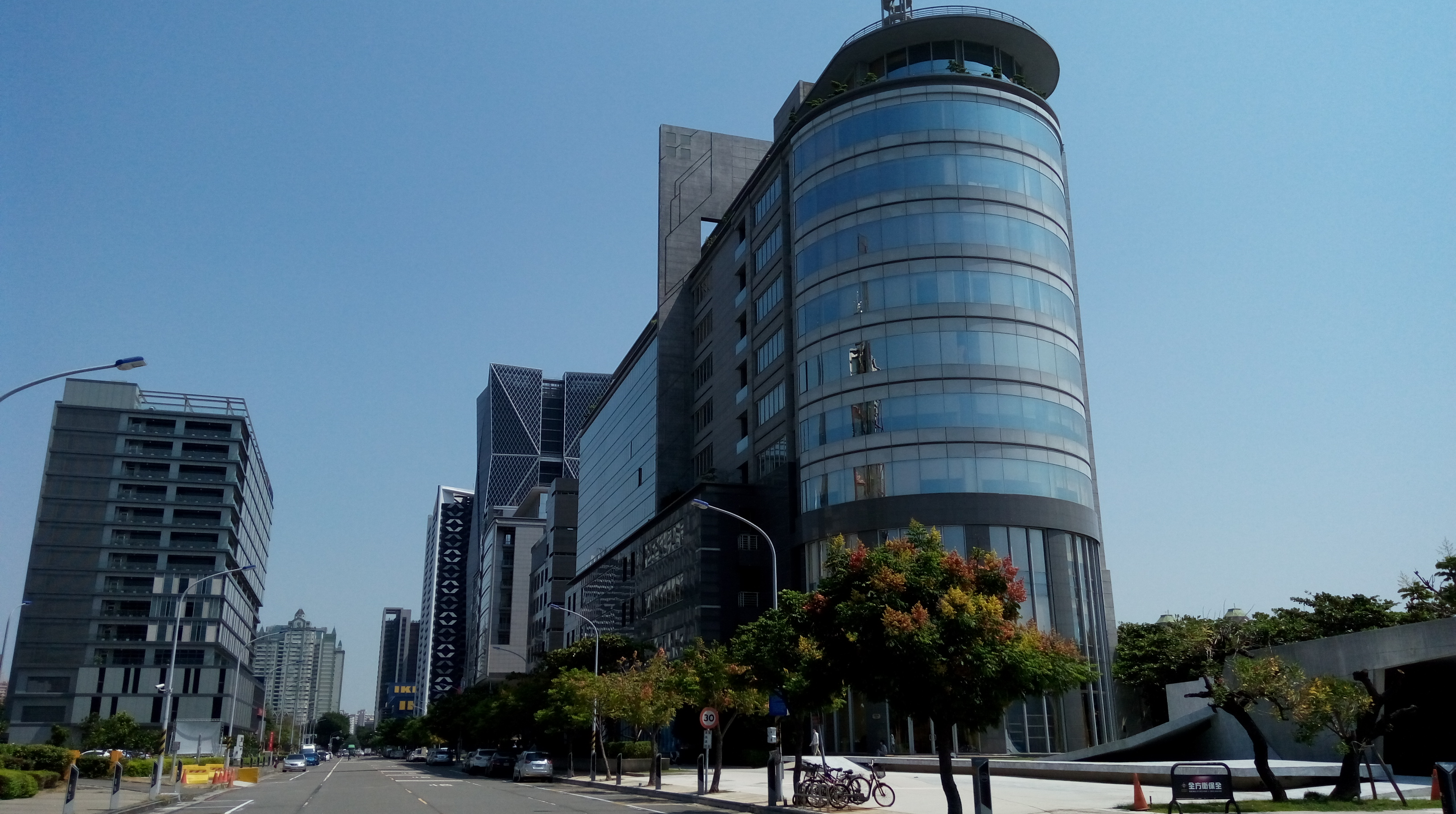
- Interactive map of Kaohsiung Software Park 高雄軟體園區
- Location: Cianjhen, Kaohsiung, Taiwan
- Coordinates: 22°36′17″N 120°17′58″E
- Opening date: 2000; 26 years ago
- Size: 7.9 ha (20 acres)
- Website: www.ivsr.org.tw/ksp

The Kaohsiung Software Park (KSP; traditional Chinese: 高雄軟體園區; simplified Chinese: 高雄软体园区; pinyin: Gāoxióng Ruǎntǐ Yuánqū) is an intelligent technology park located in Kaohsiung, Taiwan, focusing on the development of information software, digital video, and computer communication industries. It is within the Asia New Bay Area and neighbors the Kaohsiung Multi-functional Economic and Trade Park.

== Located in the park ==
- Institute for Information Industry Southern Branch Office
- Ocean Affairs Council Headquarters
  - Ocean Conservation Administration Headquarters
  - National Academy of Marine Research
- Taiwan Carbon Solution Exchange
- Taipei-1 AI Supercomputer Advanced Computing Center, owned by Nvidia

== Transportation ==
Kaohsiung Metro

- Circular Line：C7 Software Technology Park light rail station

== See also ==
- Economy of Taiwan
- Nankang Software Park
