= Taiwan Semiconductor Research Institute =

Research institute in Hsinchu, Taiwan

Taiwan Semiconductor Research Institute 國家實驗研究院台灣半導體研究中心
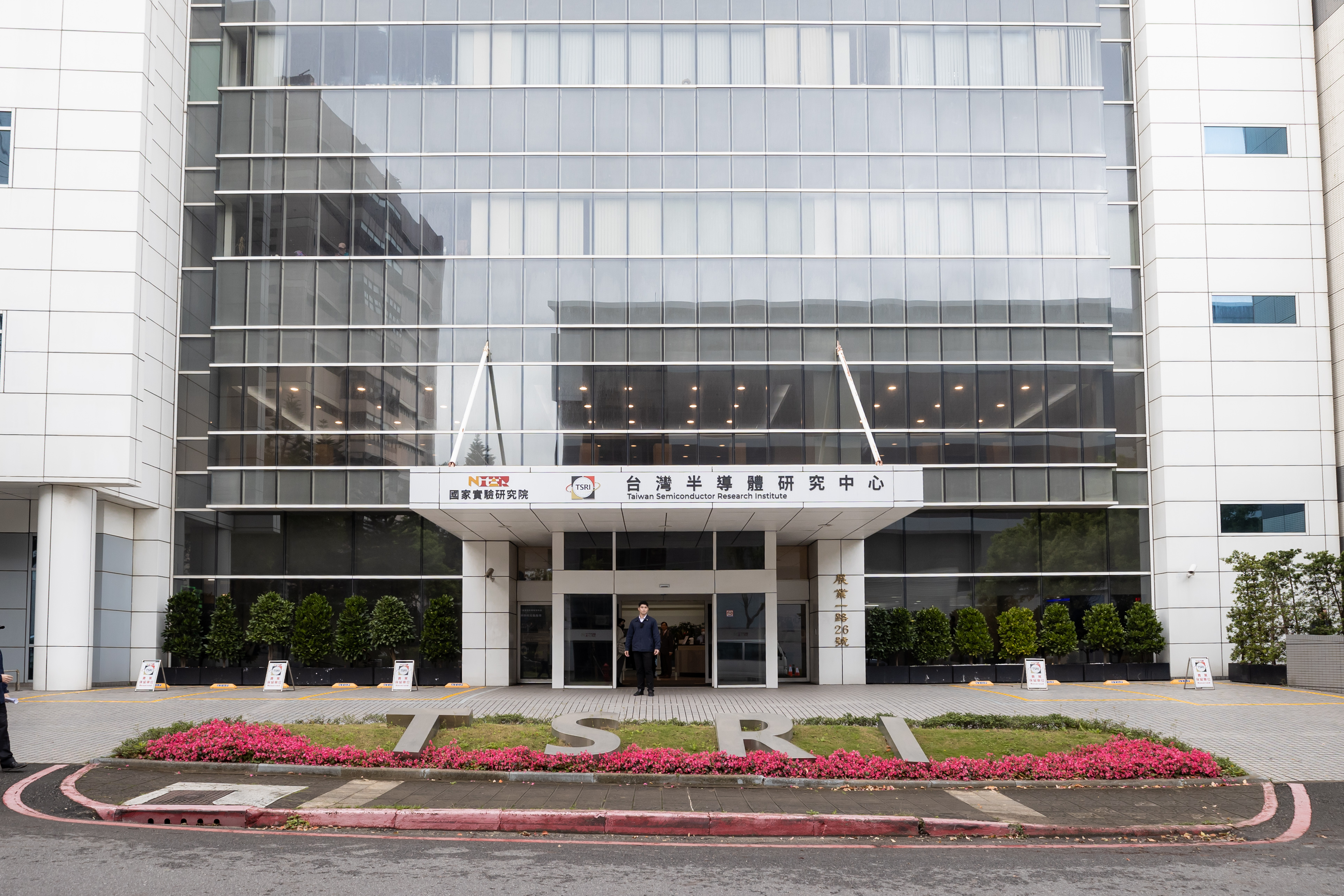
- Headquarters in Hsinchu Science Park
- Established: 2019
- Owner: Ministry of Science and Technology (Taiwan)
- Location: Hsinchu, Taiwan

The Taiwan Semiconductor Research Institute (Chinese: 國家實驗研究院台灣半導體研究中心; Pe̍h-ōe-jī: Kok-ka Si̍t-giām Gián-kiú-īⁿ Tâi-oân Poàn-tō-thé Gián-kiú Tiong-sim) (TSRI) is a research institute in Taiwan which was created in 2019 through the merger of the National Nano Device Laboratories and the National Chip Implementation Center. It is part of the National Applied Research Laboratories under the Ministry of Science.

== Overview ==
According to the China Times the Taiwan Semiconductor Research Institute is the "world’s only national science and technology research and development center which integrates integrated circuit design, chip offline manufacturing, and semiconductor component manufacturing process research."

== History ==
The Taiwan Semiconductor Research Institute was created in 2019 through the merger of the National Nano Device Laboratories and National Chip Implementation Center under the National Applied Research Laboratories. TSRI was inaugurated on Jan. 30 2019 at Hsinchu Science Park.

=== National Chip Implementation Center ===
The Chip Implementation Center Establishment Project was initiated in 1992 with the National Chip Implementation Center (NCIC) being inaugurated in 1997. In 2003 it was incorporated into NARLabs. In 2007 the CIC had 106 employees with 66 being full-time researchers.

=== National Nano Device Laboratories ===
The National Nano Device Laboratories (NDL) was implemented under the National Submicron Device Laboratories Establishment Project in 1988. They began operating their first level-10 clean room in 1992. In 1993 they were renamed the National Millimicron Device Laboratories and in 2002 they were renamed the National Nano Device Laboratories. They were incorporated into NARLabs in 2003.

== See also ==
- Semiconductor industry in Taiwan
- Artificial intelligence industry in Taiwan
- Industrial Technology Research Institute
- National Center for High-Performance Computing
