= National Center for High-Performance Computing =

National-level research laboratory under NARL

Coordinates: 24.7825°N 120.9957°E

The National Center for High-Performance Computing (NCHC; Chinese: 國家高速網路與計算中心; Tongyong Pinyin: Guójiā Gāosù Wǎnglù Yǔ Jìsuàn Jhōngsīn; Tâi-lô: kok-ka ko-sok bāng-lōo kah kè-sǹg tiong-sim) is one of ten national-level research laboratories under National Applied Research Laboratories (NARL), headquartered at Hsinchu Science Park, Hsinchu, Taiwan.

== History ==
The research center was opened in 1993. In November 2018 the National Center for High-Performance Computing owned supercomputer Taiwania 2 debuted at number 20 on the TOP500 list of fastest supercomputers.

== Operations ==
The NCHC is Taiwan's primary facility for high-performance computing (HPC) resources including large-scale computational science and engineering, cluster and grid computing, middleware development, visualization and virtual reality, data storage, networking, and HPC-related training. The NCHC is also responsible for the operation of the 20 Gbit/s Taiwan Advanced Research and Education Network (TWAREN), the national education and research network of Taiwan. The NCHC supports academia and industry with hardware and software, advanced research and application development, and professional training. Its Free Software Lab developed and maintains the free disk cloning utility Clonezilla.

=== List of supercomputers ===
- Formosa 4
- Formosa 5
- ALPS
- Taiwania (supercomputer)
- Taiwania 2
- Taiwania 3
- Taiwania 4
- Forerunner 1 (supercomputer)
- Nano 5 (supercomputer)
- Nano 4 (supercomputer)

=== Branches ===
- Hsinchu (HQ)
- Taichung
- Tainan

== See also ==
- National Science and Technology Council (Taiwan)
- Taiwan Semiconductor Research Institute
- Industrial Technology Research Institute
- Artificial intelligence industry in Taiwan
- Supercomputing in Taiwan
