= Taiwania (supercomputer) =

Supercomputer of Taiwan

Taiwania 台灣杉
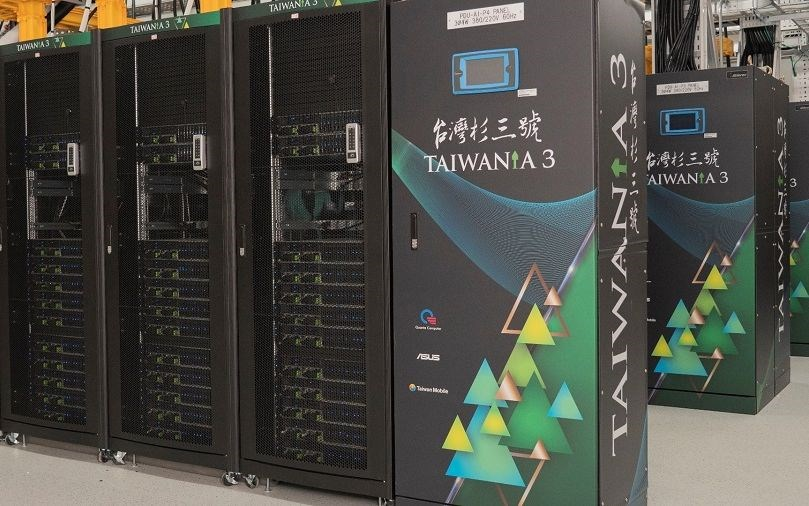
- Taiwania 3
- Introduced: 9 May 2018
- Cost: at least NT$430 million
- Type: supercomputer
- Memory: depends on system
- Connection: NVIDIA Mellanox Interconnection
- Speed: Taiwania 1:1.33 quadrillion FLOPS Taiwania 2:9 quadrillion FLOPS Taiwania 3:2.7 quadrillion FLOPS

Taiwania (traditional Chinese: 台灣杉; simplified Chinese: 台湾杉; pinyin: Táiwān Shān) is a supercomputer series in Taiwan owned by the National Applied Research Laboratories.

== History ==
The supercomputer was activated on 9 May 2018 after a two-year program to establish it with a cost of NT$430 million.

In April 2023, it was unveiled that Taiwania 1 itself will be retired and replaced by Taiwania 4.

== Technical specifications ==
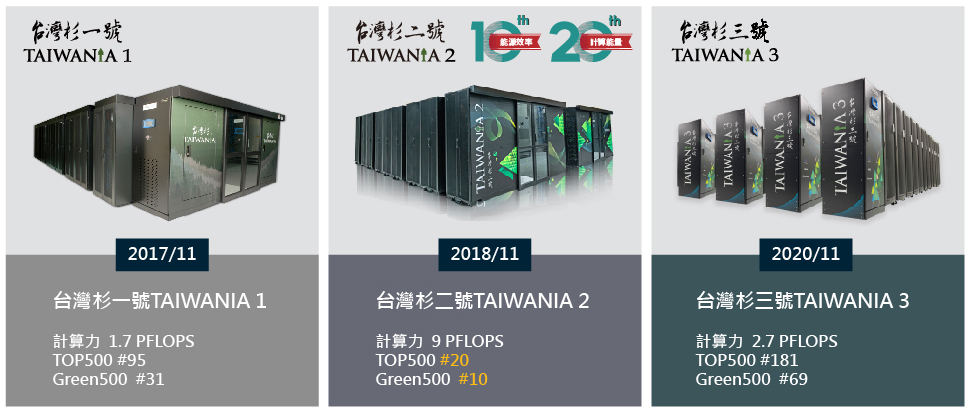
The Taiwania 1 Supercomputer has a memory of 3.4 petabytes with a maximum speed of 1.33 quadrillion FLOPS. The hardware takes up a total area of 33 m^{2}. Taiwania 2 has a maximum speed of 9 PFLOPS.

== Taiwania 2 ==
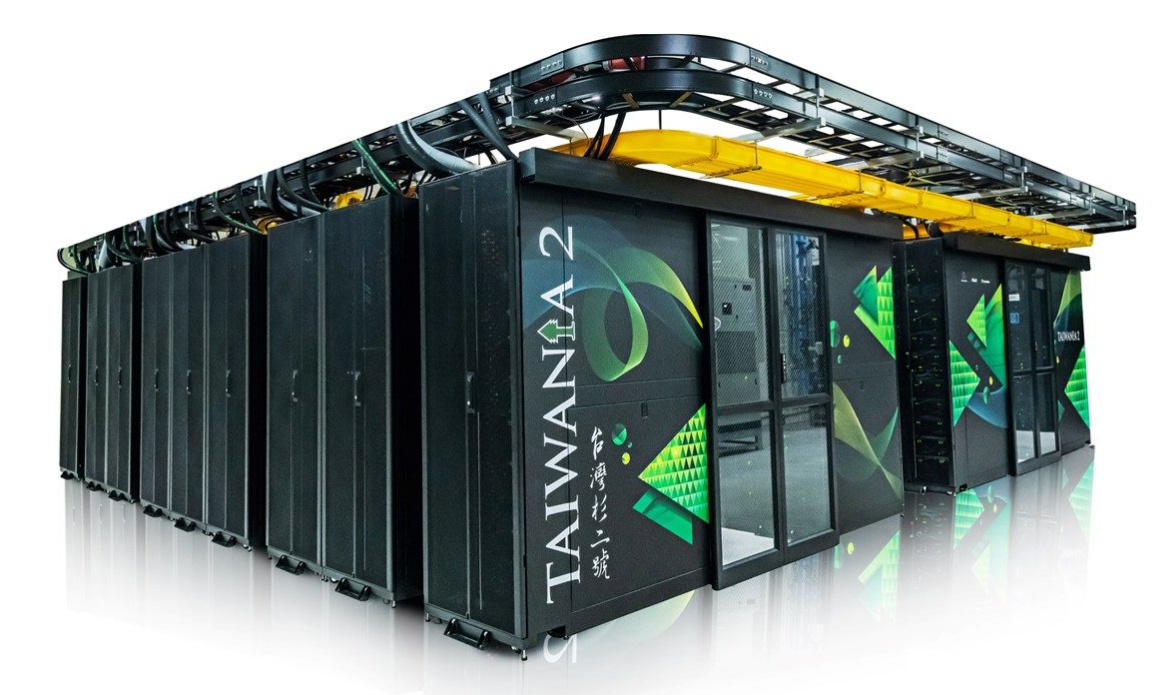
Taiwania 2

=== History ===
The Taiwania 2 supercomputer is a follow on to the Taiwania supercomputer designed by the National Center for High-Performance Computing. Taiwania 2 debuted at 20 on the November 2018 TOP500 and 10 on the Green500.

=== Technical specifications ===
Taiwania 2 has a computing capacity of 9 quadrillion floating-point operations per second (9 PetaFLOPS, or 9 PFLOPS). Its hardware consists of 252 nodes, each of which contains two Intel Xeon Gold CPUs and eight NVIDIA V100 GPUs. It runs the CentOS operating system.

== Taiwania 3 ==
Taiwania 3 is one of the supercomputers made by Taiwan. and also the newest one (August, 2021). It is placed in the National Center for High-performance Computing of NARLabs. There are 50,400 cores in total with 900 nodes, using Intel Xeon Platinum 8280 2.4 GHz CPU (28 Cores/CPU) and using CentOS as Operating System. It is an open access for public supercomputer. It is currently open access to scientists and more to do specific research after get permission from Taiwan's National Center for High-performance Computing. This is the third supercomputer of the Taiwania series. It uses CentOS x86_64 7.8 as its system operator and Slurm Workload Manager as workflow manager to ensure better performance. Taiwania 3 uses InfiniBand HDR100 100 Gbit/s high speed Internet connection to ensure better performance of the supercomputer. The main memory capability is 192 GB. There's currently two Intel Xeon Platinum 8280 2.4 GHz CPU (28 Cores/CPU) inside each node. The full calculation capability is 2.7PFLOPS. It is launched into operation in November 2020 before schedule due to the needed for COVID-19. It is currently ranked number 227 on Top 500 list of June, 2021 and number 80 on Green 500 list. It is manufactured by Quanta Computer, Taiwan Fixed Network, and ASUS Cloud.

== See also ==
- Supercomputing in Taiwan
- Semiconductor industry in Taiwan
- Taipei-1 (supercomputer)
