= Semiconductor industry in Taiwan =

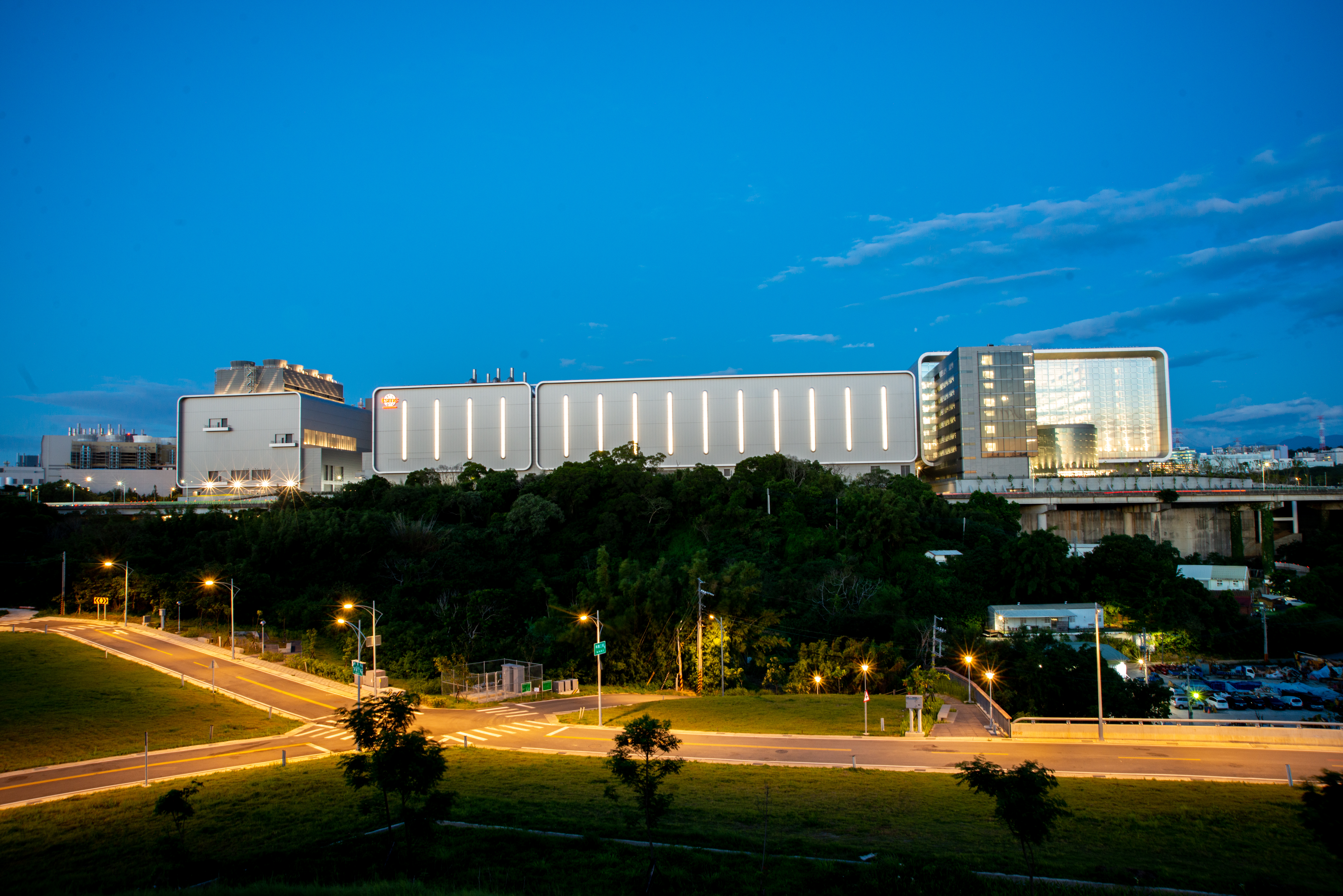
TSMC Global research and development Center in Hsinchu

The semiconductor industry, including integrated circuit manufacturing, design, and packaging, forms a major part of Taiwan's IT industry. Due to its strong capabilities in OEM wafer manufacturing and a complete industry supply chain, Taiwan has been able to distinguish itself as a leading microchip manufacturer and dominate the global marketplace.

In 2025, Taiwan's semiconductor industry output reached about NT$6.5 trillion (US$203.9 billion). Taiwan held 43% of global mature-node semiconductor manufacturing capacity in 2024, while Taiwan Semiconductor Manufacturing Company (TSMC) remained the world's largest contract chipmaker.

== Overview ==
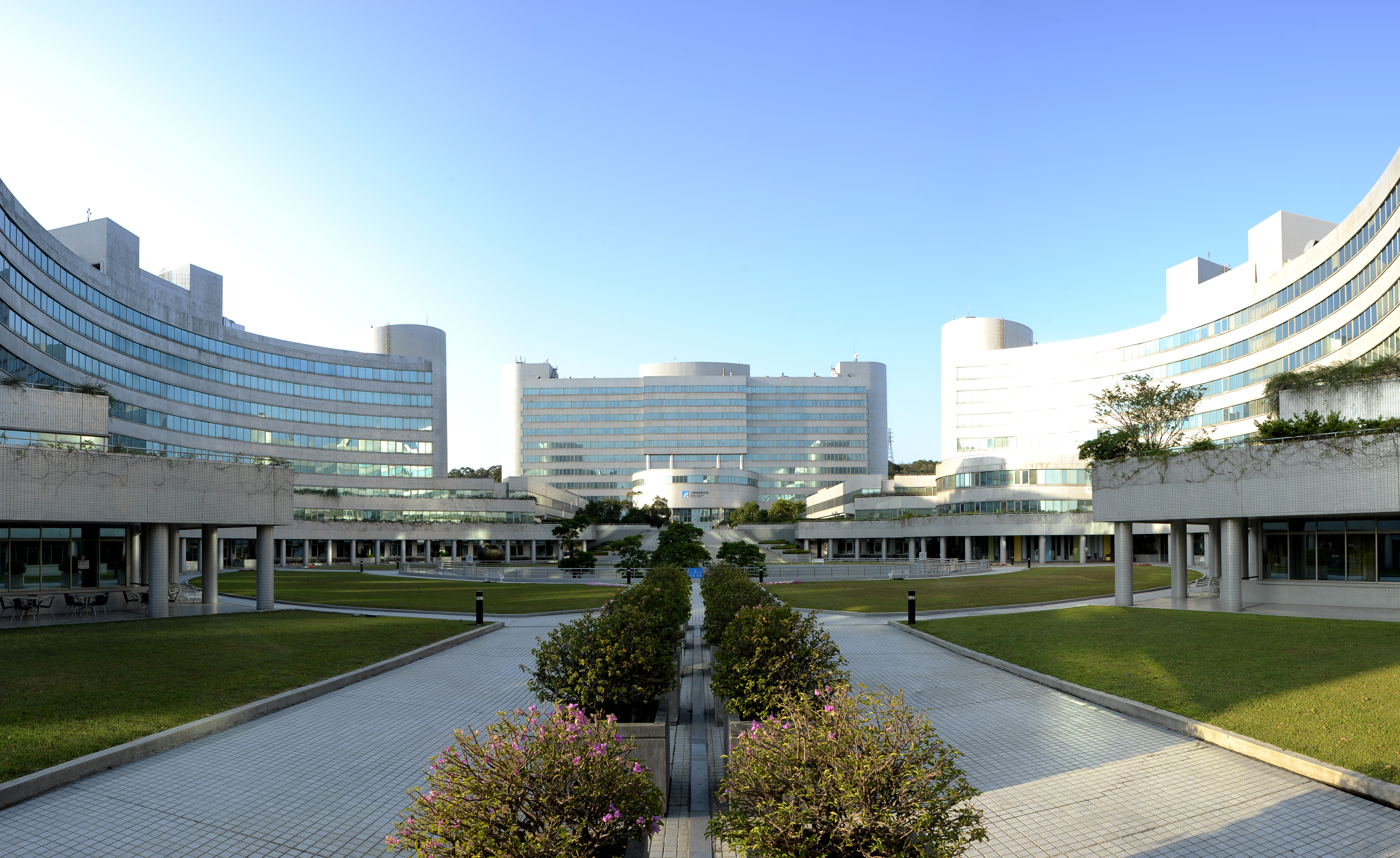
Industrial Technology Research Institute (ITRI) campus front

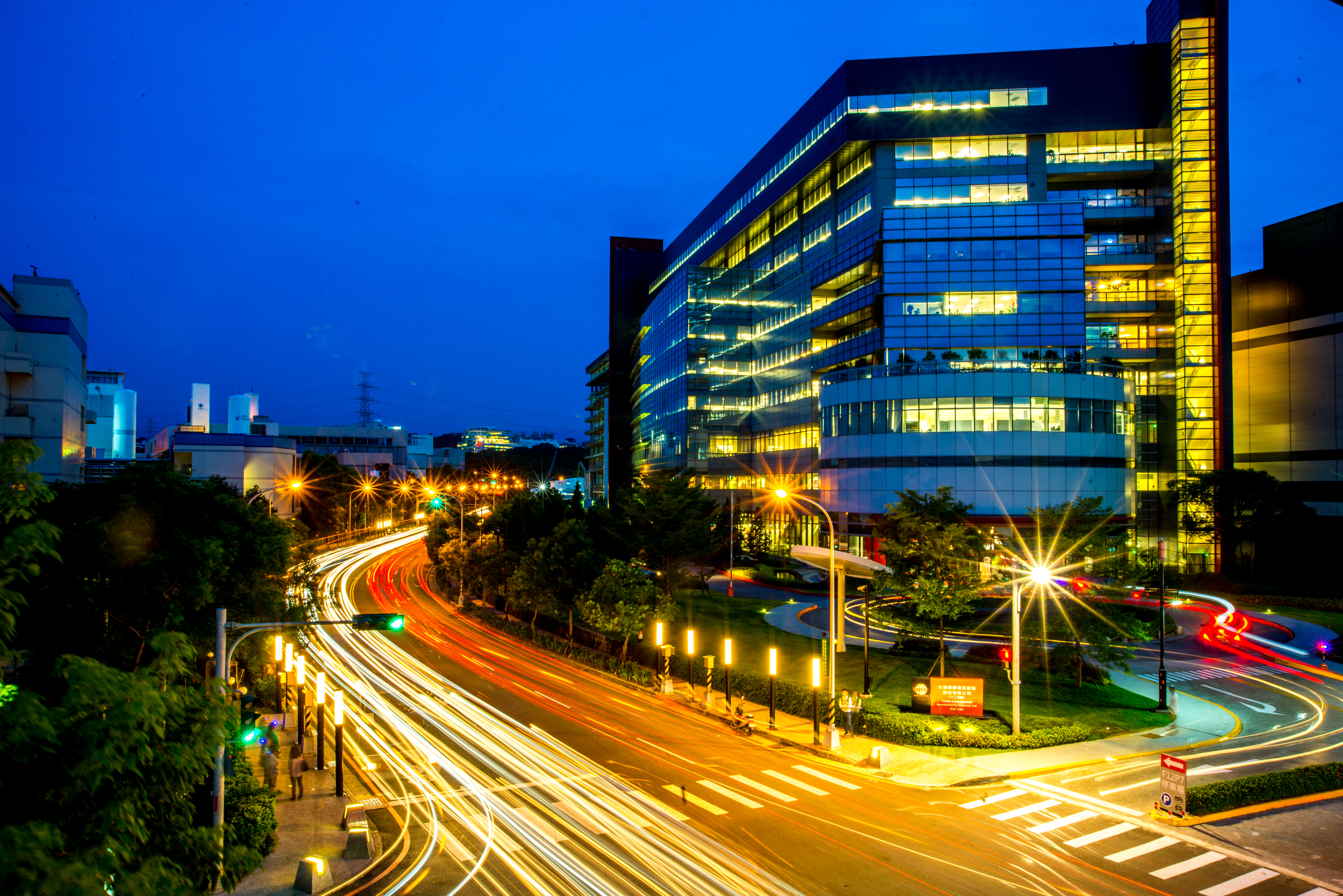
Taiwan Semiconductor Manufacturing Fab 12B at night

In the 1970s, policy decisions by technocrats like Li Kwoh-ting helped Taiwan pivot from low-tech manufacturing to high-tech industries. The 1976 RCA Project, one of the first significant policy shifts, facilitated critical technology transfer from the U.S., which led to Taiwan's first IC plant and laid the groundwork for technological self-reliance. Further early developments included the founding of the Industrial Technology Research Institute (1973), United Microelectronics Corporation (1980), and the Hsinchu Science Park (1980).

Morris Chang's founding of Taiwan Semiconductor Manufacturing Company (TSMC) in 1987 was a foundational moment for Taiwan's semiconductor industry. Close ties with Silicon Valley and the return of engineers trained in the U.S. fostered a startup ecosystem distinct from the conglomerate-driven models of Japan and South Korea.

TSMC now produces over half the world's advanced chips, supplying firms like Apple Inc. and Nvidia. However, its strategic value has made Taiwan a key geopolitical flashpoint, especially amid U.S.-China tensions. The semiconductor industry is one facet of a wider geopolitical contention regarding Taiwan's independence from China. Taiwan has responded to the crisis by growing closer to the United States, via investments in U.S.-based fabs, including a $65 billion project in Arizona, supported in part by the CHIPS and Science Act.

China's industrial espionage campaigns have targeted Taiwan's semiconductor sector. In response, Taiwan has strengthened cybersecurity, enacted stricter investment laws, and bolstered domestic talent retention.

== History ==
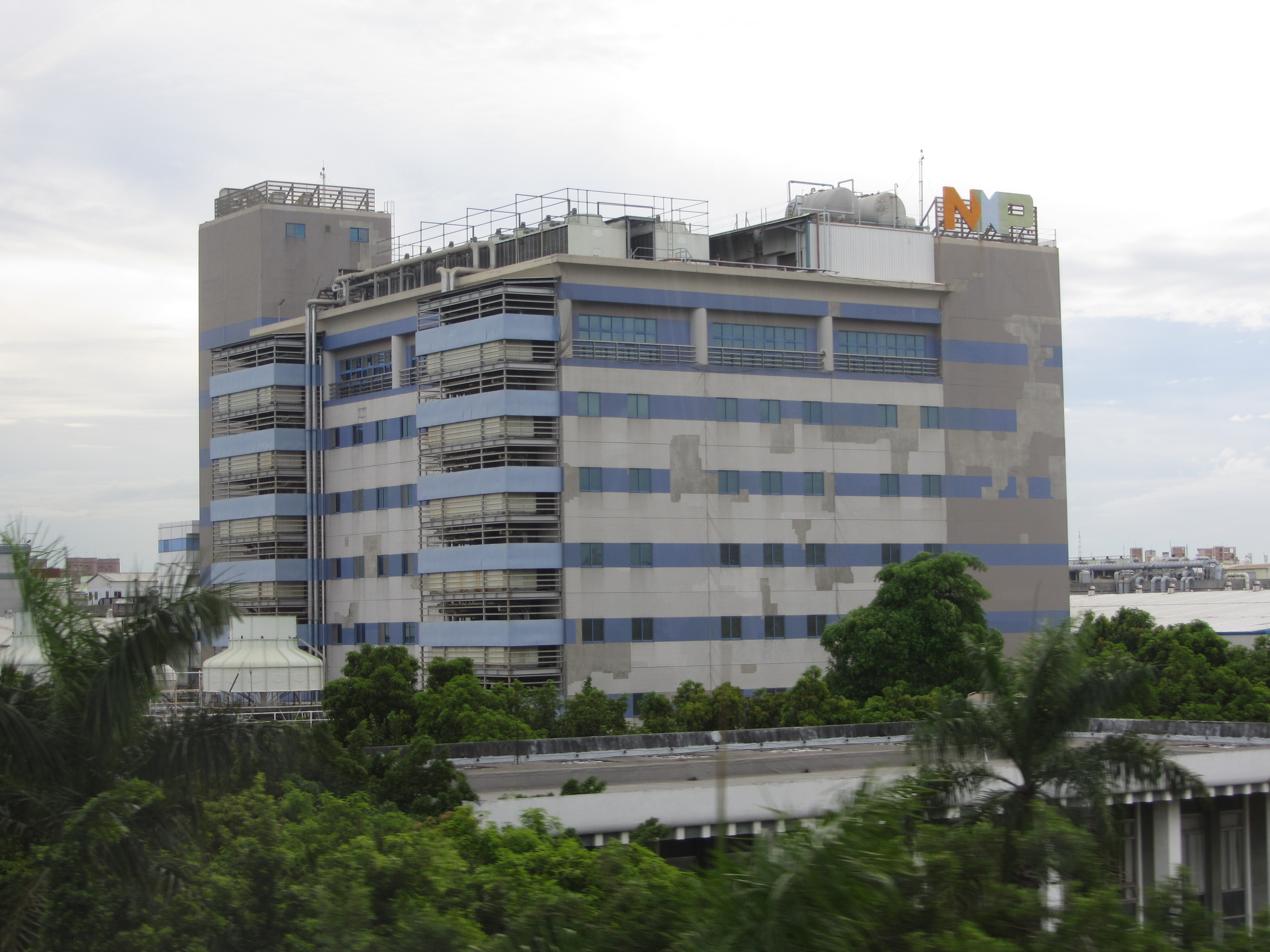
NXP Semiconductors Kaohsiung Factory

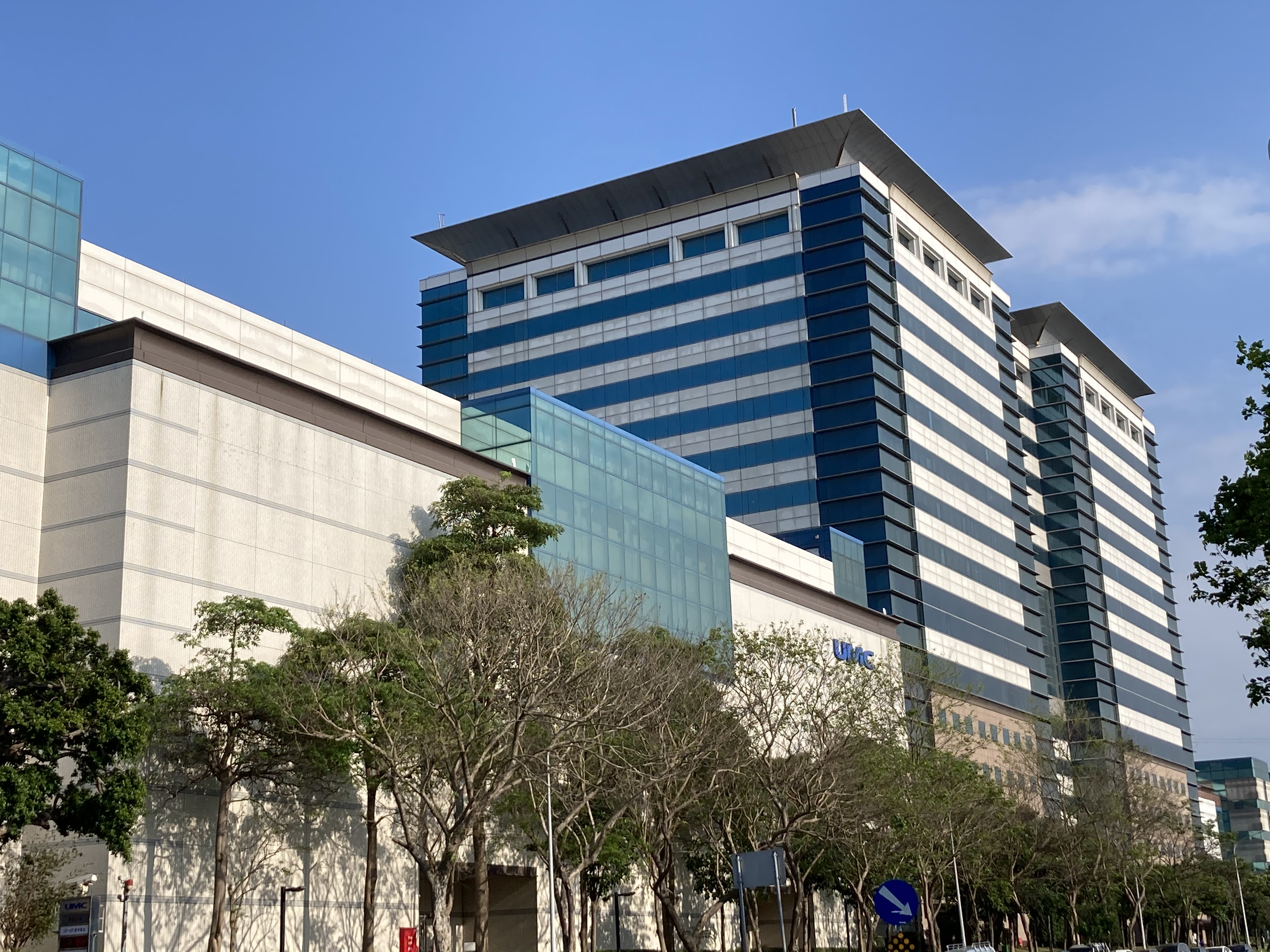
UMC headquarters

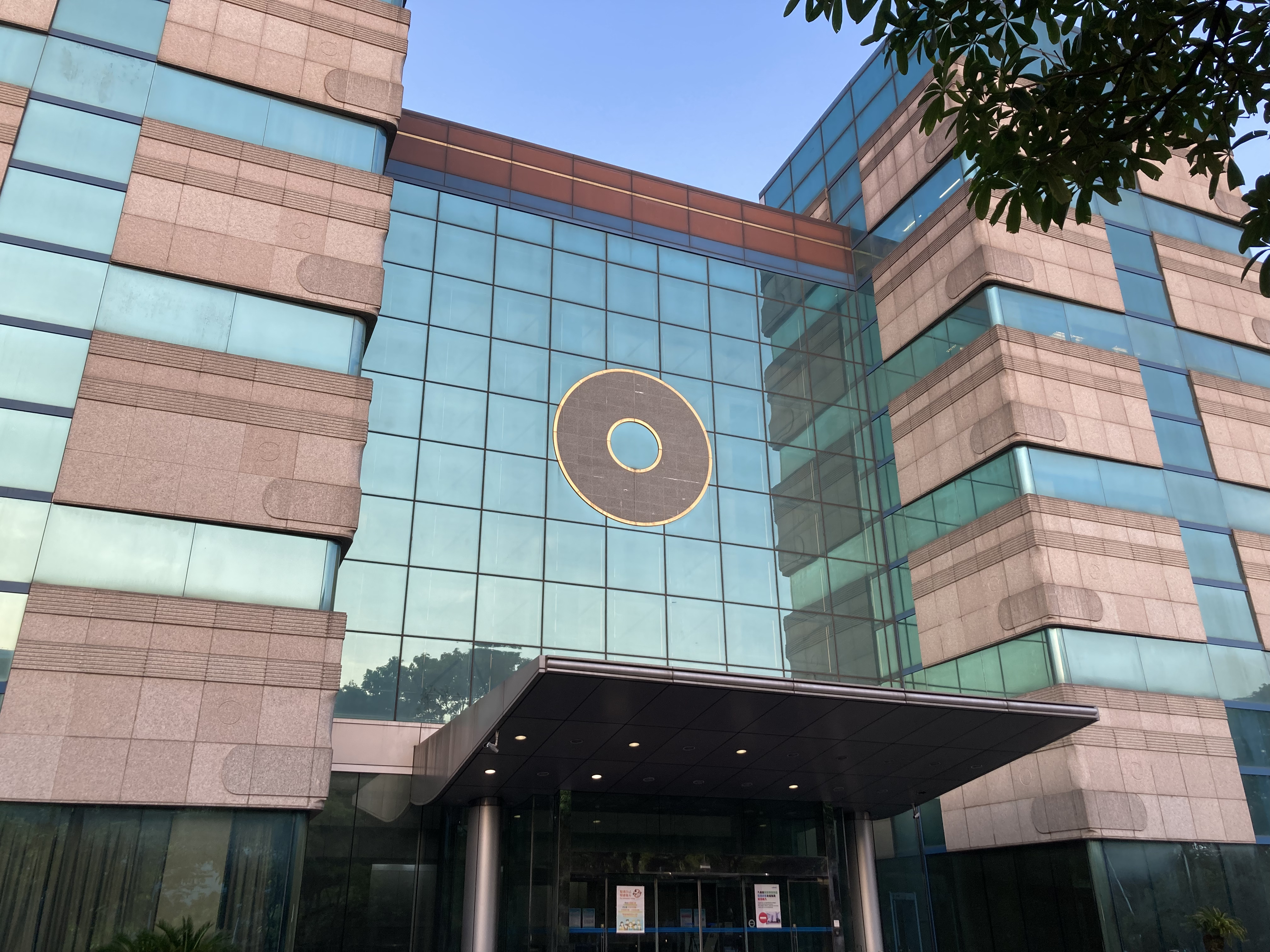
UMC 8AB Fab

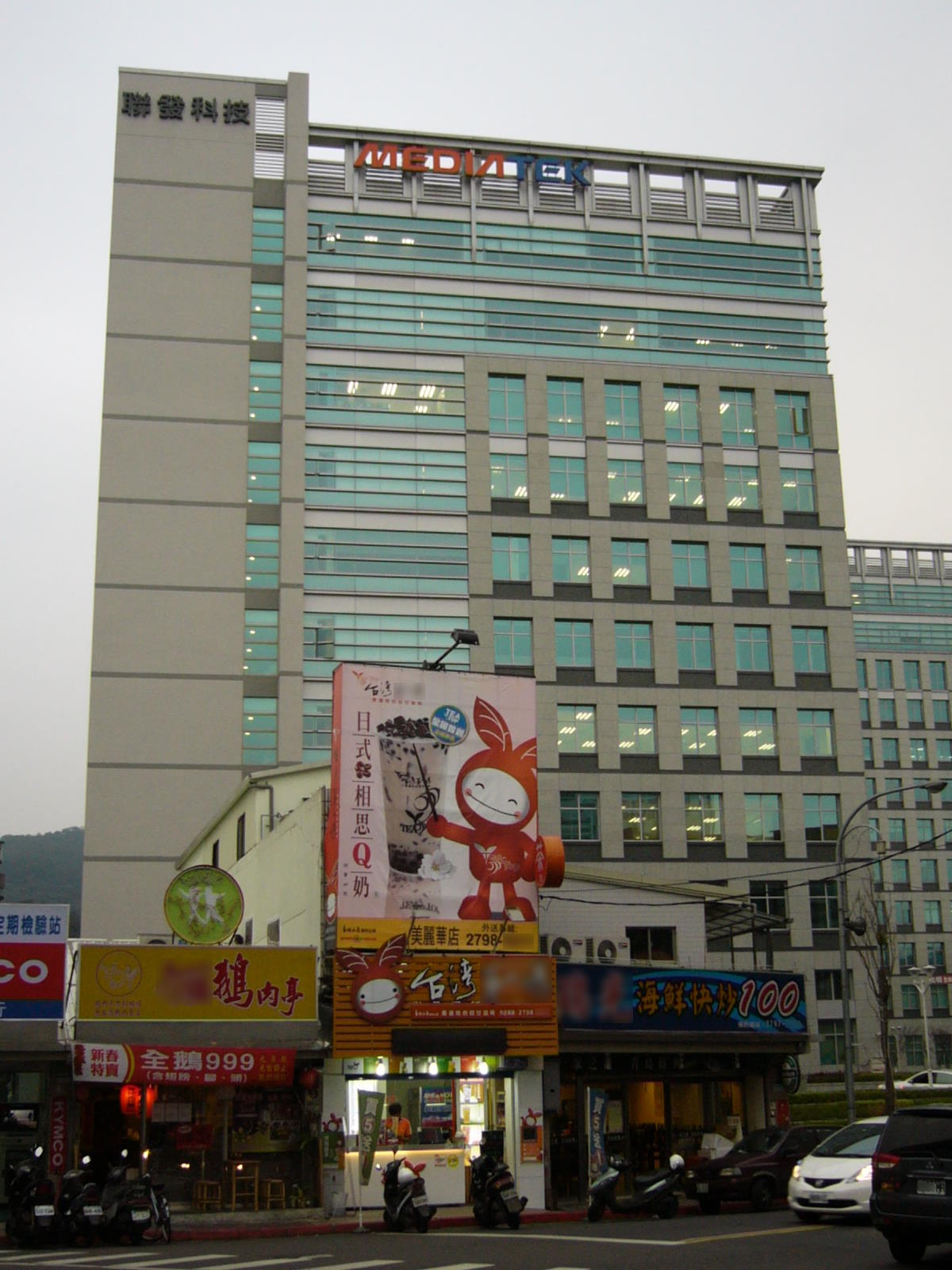
MediaTek Taipei Branch

The Taiwanese semiconductor industry got its start in 1974. In 1976 the government convinced RCA to transfer semiconductor technology to Taiwan. Under the direction of Chiang Ching-Kuo the government appointed the Industrial Technology Research Institute (ITRI) to lead the development of the industry with an emphasis on developing commercial products rather than pure scientific advances. ITRI sent four teams of engineers to train at RCA before building a demonstration factory in Taiwan. The demonstration factory was able to achieve higher yields than RCA's fabs in the US. The demonstration factory was spun off by ITRI in 1980 as United Microelectronics Corporation (UMC). UMC received initial investment from both private and public sources.

In 1987, TSMC pioneered the fabless foundry model, reshaping the global semiconductor industry. From ITRI's first 3-inch wafer fabrication plant built in 1977 and the founding of UMC in 1980 the industry expanded rapidly. MediaTek was originally a unit of UMC, tasked with designing chipsets for home entertainment products. On May 28, 1997, the unit was spun off and incorporated. MediaTek Inc. was listed on the Taiwan Stock Exchange (TSEC) under the "2454" code on July 23, 2001. The industry had developed into a world leader with 40 fabs in operation by 2002. In 2007, the semiconductor industry overtook that of the United States, second only to Japan.

The sector output reached US$39 billion in 2009, ranking first in global market share in IC manufacturing, packaging, and testing, and second in IC design. Although the 2008 financial crisis affected sales and exports, the industry has rebounded with companies posting record profits for 2010. In 2010 Taiwan had the largest share of 300 nm, 90 nm, and 60 nm manufacturing capacities worldwide, and was expected to pass Japan in total IC fab capacity by mid-2011. By 2020, Taiwan was the unmatched leader of the global semiconductor industry with Taiwan Semiconductor Manufacturing Company (TSMC) alone accounting for more than 50% of the global market.

In the 2020s artificial intelligence processing emerged as a significant demand driver for the Taiwanese semiconductor industry.

While Taiwan continues to dominate global semiconductor manufacturing, its critical role in global supply chains has placed it at the center of geopolitical tensions, especially between the United States and China. In response to growing concerns about supply chain resilience, and the Trump Administration's contentions that Taiwan had taken away the chip business from the United States, TSMC pledged to invest $100 billion in three new fabrication plants and two packaging facilities in Arizona. Taiwan remains a global leader in semiconductor manufacturing, with TSMC at the forefront. TSMC produces over 50% of the world's advanced semiconductors, supplying critical components to tech giants like Apple, Nvidia, and AMD.

In 2025 the Merck Group opened a major semiconductor components and supplies production facility in Kaohsiung.

== Challenges facing industry development ==
=== Cyber espionage and cybersecurity threats ===
The Taiwanese semiconductor industry has become a primary target of Chinese intelligence operations due to its global strategic importance. Chinese state-sponsored actors have engaged in cyber espionage campaigns aimed at acquiring proprietary Taiwanese semiconductor technologies and undermining supply chain resilience. For example, a 2024 report by cybersecurity firm FireEye identified a surge in activity by the Chinese-affiliated threat group APT41, which targeted Taiwan's semiconductor research institutions through spear-phishing emails and the deployment of custom malware tools such as Cobalt Strike and PlugX.

A joint investigation by the Hsinchu, Taipei, and New Taipei City prosecutors' offices revealed in September 2024 that eight Chinese semiconductor firms—including Naura Technology Group Co, Shanghai New Vision Microelectronics Co, and iCommsemi—allegedly concealed their corporate identities to recruit engineers from Hsinchu Science Park illegally. These efforts form part of a broader pattern of cyber and human intelligence operations, which, according to Taiwan's Ministry of Justice Investigation Bureau (MJIB), resulted in over 2.4 million cyber intrusion attempts per day in 2024—double the volume recorded in 2023.

To counteract these threats, Taiwan has passed amendments to its National Security Act, tightening restrictions on foreign investment in key technologies and enhancing legal penalties for unauthorized technology transfers. Taiwan has also established partnerships with international cybersecurity firms and government agencies, including the U.S. Cybersecurity and Infrastructure Security Agency (CISA) and Japan's National Center of Incident Readiness and Strategy for Cybersecurity (NISC), to coordinate on intelligence sharing and best practices. In parallel, the Taiwanese government has funded public-private cybersecurity initiatives and expanded educational outreach programs focused on cyber hygiene for businesses and academic institutions.

=== Talent poaching and industrial policy ===
Beyond cyber intrusion, Chinese efforts to access Taiwan's semiconductor expertise include talent recruitment campaigns. According to a 2024 analysis by the Taiwanese think tank Institute for National Defense and Security Research (INDSR), Chinese firms have offered engineers up to three times their local salaries, along with relocation packages and incentives, to join mainland companies. These campaigns often operate through shell companies or overseas research collaborations, complicating enforcement efforts.

In response, Taiwan has expanded subsidies, tax incentives, and career development grants under its Semiconductor Industry Talent Cultivation Program, designed to retain high-skill workers and encourage university-industry collaboration domestically. Complementing these policy efforts, Taiwan Semiconductor Manufacturing Company (TSMC), the world's leading contract chipmaker, has launched a competitive Ph.D. scholarship program targeting top-tier engineering and science students.

Taiwan has introduced a legislative package often referred to as its version of the "CHIPS Act" where the government offers a 25% tax credit on eligible research and development (R&D) expenditures and a 5% tax credit for capital investments in advanced manufacturing equipment.

Beijing has denied allegations of state-directed theft and framed its industrial development as part of its Made in China 2025 strategy.

In August 2026, Taiwan announced an investigation into 17 Chinese companies which are suspected of illegally recruiting Taiwanese workers from the semiconductor and other high-tech industries.

=== Taiwanese policy and regional cooperation ===
Taiwan's response to these multifaceted challenges includes policy innovation and regional engagement. In addition to cybersecurity reforms, the Taiwanese government has pursued greater alignment with allies through the U.S.-Taiwan Tech Trade and Investment Framework and trilateral dialogues with Japan and South Korea focused on semiconductor supply chain resilience.

== Geopolitics ==
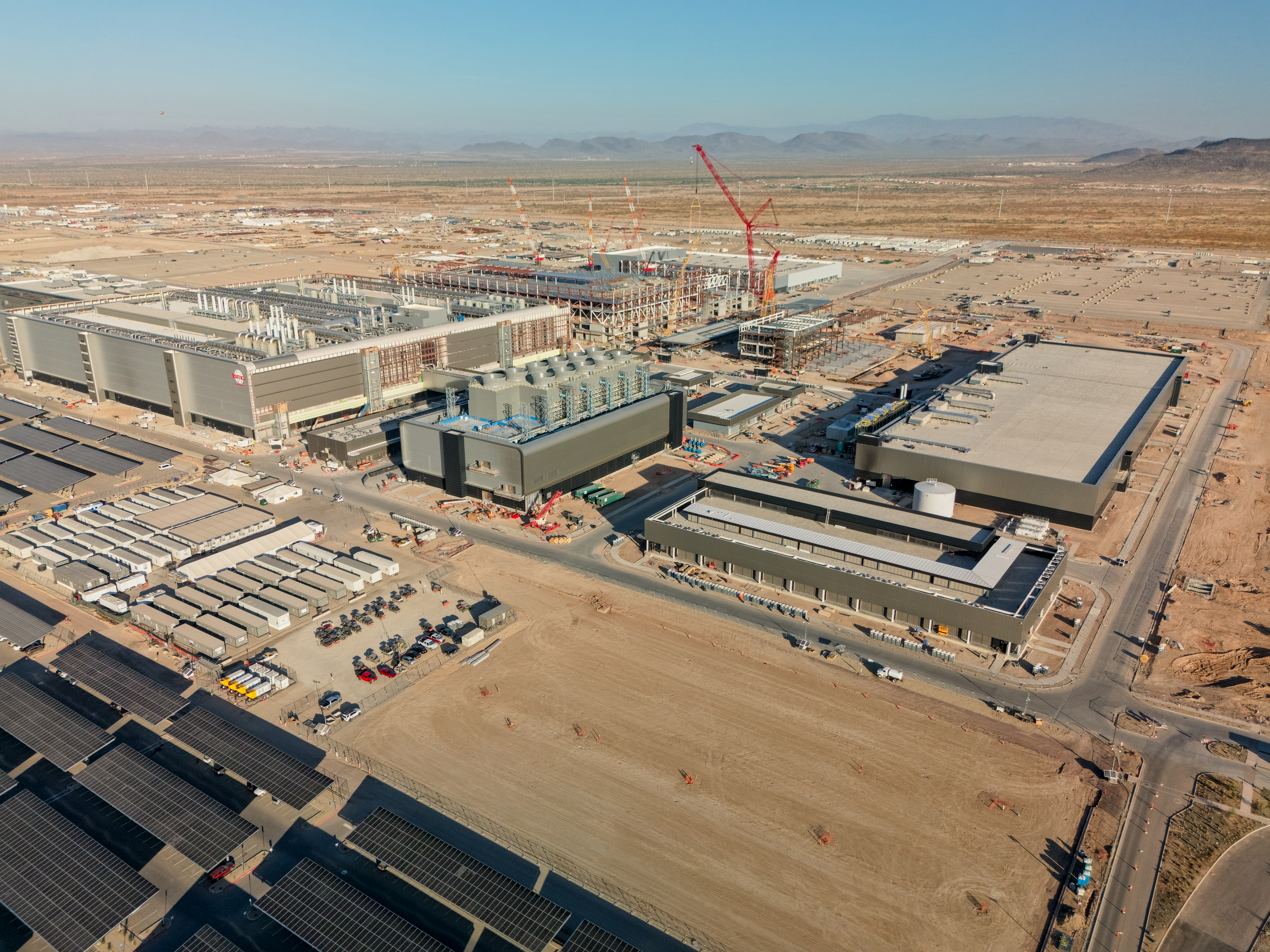
TSMC Fab 21 under construction in Arizona

Taiwanese TSMC and South Korean rival Samsung have near total control of the leading edge of the semiconductor industry with TSMC significantly ahead of Samsung. This situation in which global production capabilities have been concentrated in just a few selected countries leads to significant geopolitical challenges and contributes heavily to changes in global techno-politics.

Due to its significant position in both the American and Chinese tech industry supply chains, Taiwan has been enmeshed in the technological front of the China–United States trade war and the larger geopolitical conflict between the two powers. The US prohibited companies which use American equipment or IP from exporting products to prohibited companies in China. This forced Taiwanese semiconductor companies to stop doing business with major Chinese clients like Huawei.

In January 2021 the German government appealed to the Taiwanese government to help persuade Taiwanese semiconductor companies to ramp up production as a global semiconductor shortage was hampering the German economy's recovery from the COVID-19 pandemic. A lack of semiconductors had caused vehicle production lines to be idled, leading German Economy Minister Peter Altmaier to personally reach out to Taiwan's economics affairs minister Wang Mei-hua in an attempt to get Taiwanese semiconductor companies to increase their manufacturing capacity. Similar requests had been made by the United States, the European Union, and Japan. The Taiwanese government and TSMC announced that as much as possible priority would be given to automakers from Taiwan's close geopolitical allies.

In April 2021 the US Government blacklisted seven Chinese supercomputing companies due to alleged involvement in supplying equipment to the Peoples Liberation Army (PLA), Chinese military–industrial complex, and Weapon of Mass Destruction (WMD) programs. In response Taiwanese chipmakers Alchip and TSMC suspended new orders from Chinese supercomputing company Tianjin Phytium Information Technology.

The geopolitical strength of the semiconductor industry is often referred to as Taiwan's "Silicon Shield." According to the New York Times, "Taiwan has relied on its dominance of the microchip industry for its defense," and that, "because its semiconductor industry is so important to Chinese manufacturing and the United States consumer economy, actions that threaten its foundries would be too risky." In 2022, former U.S. Deputy National Security Advisor Matthew Pottinger challenged the existence of a "Silicon Shield" arguing that China does not behave in ways which appear rational to audiences in democratic countries. Some analysts and policymakers in the U.S. even conflate the importance of TSMC to the decision-making process of the Chinese leadership in their plans in militarily unifying Taiwan, to the extent that they advocated a controversial plan to destroy Taiwanese semiconductor fabrication facilities in the event of a successful Chinese invasion of Taiwan to prevent China from gaining control of the industry, due to concerns that China could seize the facilities and leverage them for future economic or military advantages.

International policy measures have been taken in attempts to ensure the longevity TSMC's manufacturing output by third parties such as the United States. Through policy efforts such as the CHIPS and Science Act, the United States and Taiwanese governments have taken steps to bolster TSMC's manufacturing capability on U.S. soil. Such policy efforts were put in place after geopolitical tensions between the United States and China demonstrated a potential weak point in the nation's reliance on foreign manufacturing. Notably, TSMC announced plans to build a $12 billion semiconductor manufacturing plant in Arizona, enhancing their semiconductor production capabilities on international land.

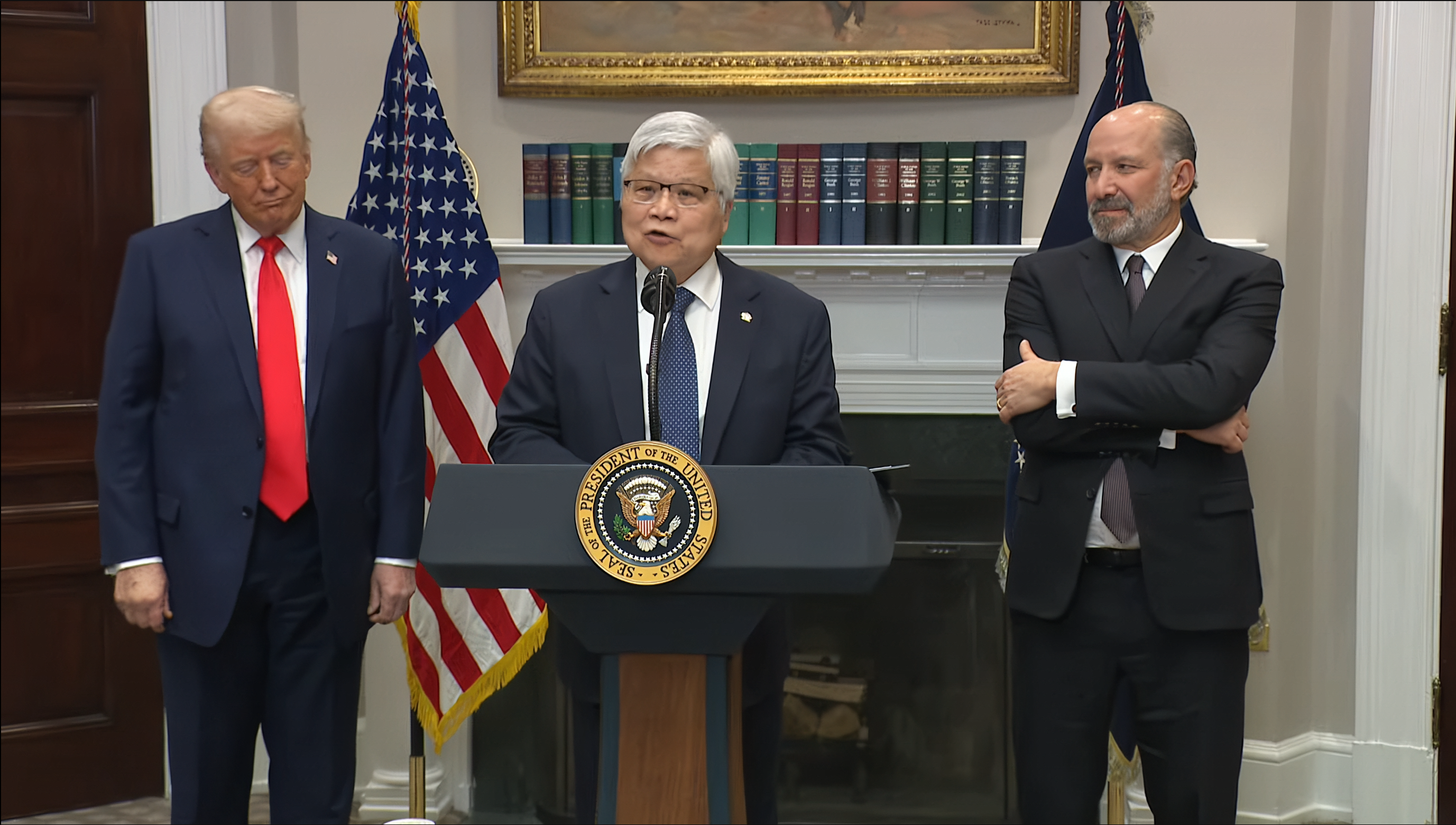
TSMC Chairman and CEO C. C. Wei standing next to President Donald Trump and Howard Lutnick, announcing that TSMC is planning to invest in the U.S., 3 March 2025

In April 2024, the United States Department of Commerce provided TSMC Arizona with a grant for a total of $6.6 billion in funding under the CHIPS and Science Act. Additionally, the two countries are investing in joint research initiatives and workforce development programs to provide a steady pipeline of skilled workers for the semiconductor industry. TSMC's expansion into the United States has also been met with significant challenges, particularly in its Arizona plant, facing a 1-year delay on its planned operating date. Some TSMC managers have attributed the plant's troubled development to cultural clashes between TSMC's management and American workers.

U.S. President Donald Trump criticized Taiwan for its dominance in the U.S. semiconductor industry. In February 2025, China accused Taiwan of using its semiconductor sector to gain political favor from the United States.

According to U.S. think-tank German Marshall Fund, Trump's approach (or the general approach of the U.S.) has negatively affected Taiwanese populations' perception of the U.S. According to a March survey conducted by Global Views Research, a majority of respondents in Taiwan believe that TSMC's move to produce advanced semiconductors in the United States diminishes the island's "silicon shield" and viewed the company's U.S. investment as the result of American political pressure. This assessment contrasts with statements by Taiwanese President Lai Ching-te, who has denied that the decision was made under external coercion. Public concern centered on the possibility that relocating a significant share of TSMC's most advanced chip production to facilities in the U.S. could reduce the strategic incentive for the United States to defend Taiwan in the event of an attack by China. The think-tank warned that such a self-serving approach will potentially weaken the resolve of Taiwanese citizens to defend themselves.

== Environmental and sustainability issues ==
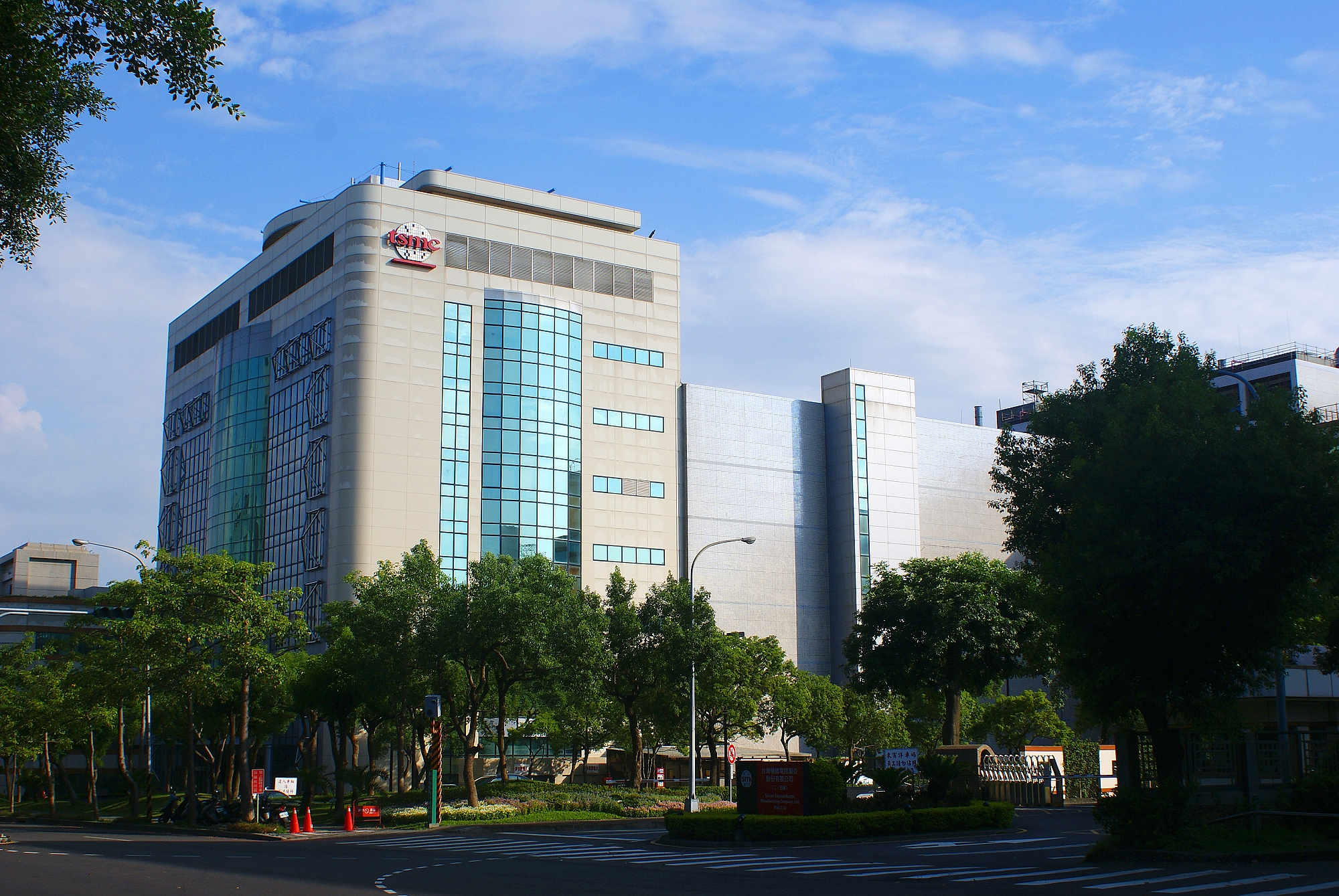
TSMC Fab 5

The semiconductor industry uses a large portion of the power produced in Taiwan. By 2022 TSMC alone is estimated to consume 7.2% of Taiwan's total power output. Due to pressure from customers and government regulations the semiconductor industry has been switching to green power. In July 2020 TSMC signed a 20-year deal with Ørsted to buy the entire production of two offshore wind farms under development off Taiwan's west coast. At the time of its signing it was the largest corporate green energy order ever made. Much of the switch to renewable energy has been mandated by Apple Inc. whose primary components suppliers are located on Taiwan.

The rapid growth of Taiwan's semiconductor industry has placed considerable strain on the island's natural resources, particularly in terms of water usage, energy consumption, and carbon emissions. Semiconductor fabrication is a resource-intensive process requiring ultrapure water, cleanroom facilities, and uninterrupted power. Taiwan Semiconductor Manufacturing Company (TSMC), the world's largest contract chipmaker, reportedly consumes over 150,000 tons of water per day—approximately 10% of the daily water supply in Hsinchu City, where one of the country's largest science parks is located. This dependence on stable water access has heightened the sector's vulnerability to climate-related disruptions. For instance, during the severe drought of 2021—the worst Taiwan had seen in over 50 years—the government was forced to ration water and deliver it by truck to ensure uninterrupted chip production.

Electricity usage has also surged in tandem with the industry's expansion. Taiwan's power grid, still heavily reliant on coal and natural gas, has struggled to keep pace with rising demand. The semiconductor sector's energy consumption is projected to increase significantly over the next decade, particularly with the construction of new advanced fabrication facilities (fabs) both domestically and overseas.

In response, both the private sector and the Taiwanese government have introduced a range of initiatives aimed at improving sustainability. TSMC has pledged to achieve net-zero emissions by 2050 and to power all global operations with 100% renewable energy within that same timeframe. The company has also invested in water conservation technologies, including high-efficiency wastewater recycling systems capable of reclaiming over 85% of water used in fabrication processes.

== Exhibitions and conferences ==
=== Computex ===
COMPUTEX Taipei, or Taipei International Information Technology Show (Chinese: 台北國際電腦展; pinyin: Táiběi Guójì Diànnǎo Zhǎn), is a computer expo held annually in Taipei, Taiwan. Since the early 2000s, it is one of the largest computer and technology trade shows in the world.

The most recent COMPUTEX was held from June 2 to 5, 2026 with sessions about such topics as AI servers, edge computing, robotics, automation, smart mobility, next-generation communications, and immersive technologies.

COMPUTEX 2020 was cancelled after a delay from early June to 28 September due to public health safety concerns of the COVID-19 pandemic.

COMPUTEX is co-organized by government-funded Taiwan External Trade Development Council (TAITRA) and private sector Taipei Computer Association (TCA). The first expo, then called Taipei Computer Show, was held in 1981 and started out as a place where small and medium-sized businesses in Taiwan's nascent computer industry could display their products. Stan Shih, a former head of the TCA, proposed to change to the current name in the fourth expo. As Taiwan's information technology industry took off in the early 1990s and as the Foreign Trade Council Display Hall in Taipei Songshan Airport was put back into use in the eighth and ninth expo, COMPUTEX has since rapidly expanded and become an important showcase for the IT industry globally. On 28 November 2018 (the same day that Deutsche Messe AG announced that there would not be a 2019 CeBIT), it became the largest computer expo in the world, with participation from major manufacturers such as Intel, AMD, NVIDIA, and others, as well as Taiwanese brand names such as Acer and ASUS.

The 2026 event, held June 2-5 in Taipei, was focused heavily on AI and the technologies that run behind the models, with Nvidia as a large part of that.

== See also ==
- Defense industry of Taiwan
- List of semiconductor companies in the United States
- Taiwania (supercomputer)
- Taiwania 3
