= National Academy of Marine Research =

Government agency of Taiwan

- 國家海洋研究院

Agency overview
- Formed: 24 April 2019; 7 years ago
- Headquarters: Cianjhen, Kaohsiung, Taiwan (Kaohsiung Software Park)
- Agency executive: Chung-Ling Chen, President
- Parent agency: Ocean Affairs Council
- Website: Official website

The National Academy of Marine Research (NAMR; traditional Chinese: 國家海洋研究院; simplified Chinese: 国家海洋研究院; pinyin: Guójiā Hǎiyáng Yánjiùyuàn) a research institute of Taiwan dealing with ocean-related policy planning, research and marine industries development.

== History ==
The research institute was established on 24 April 2019.

== President ==
- Dr. Chung-Ling Chen (1 January 2025-)

== See also ==
- Geography of Taiwan
- Maritime industries of Taiwan
