= National Institutes of Applied Research =

Research institute in Da'an, Taipei, Taiwan

- 財團法人國家實驗研究院
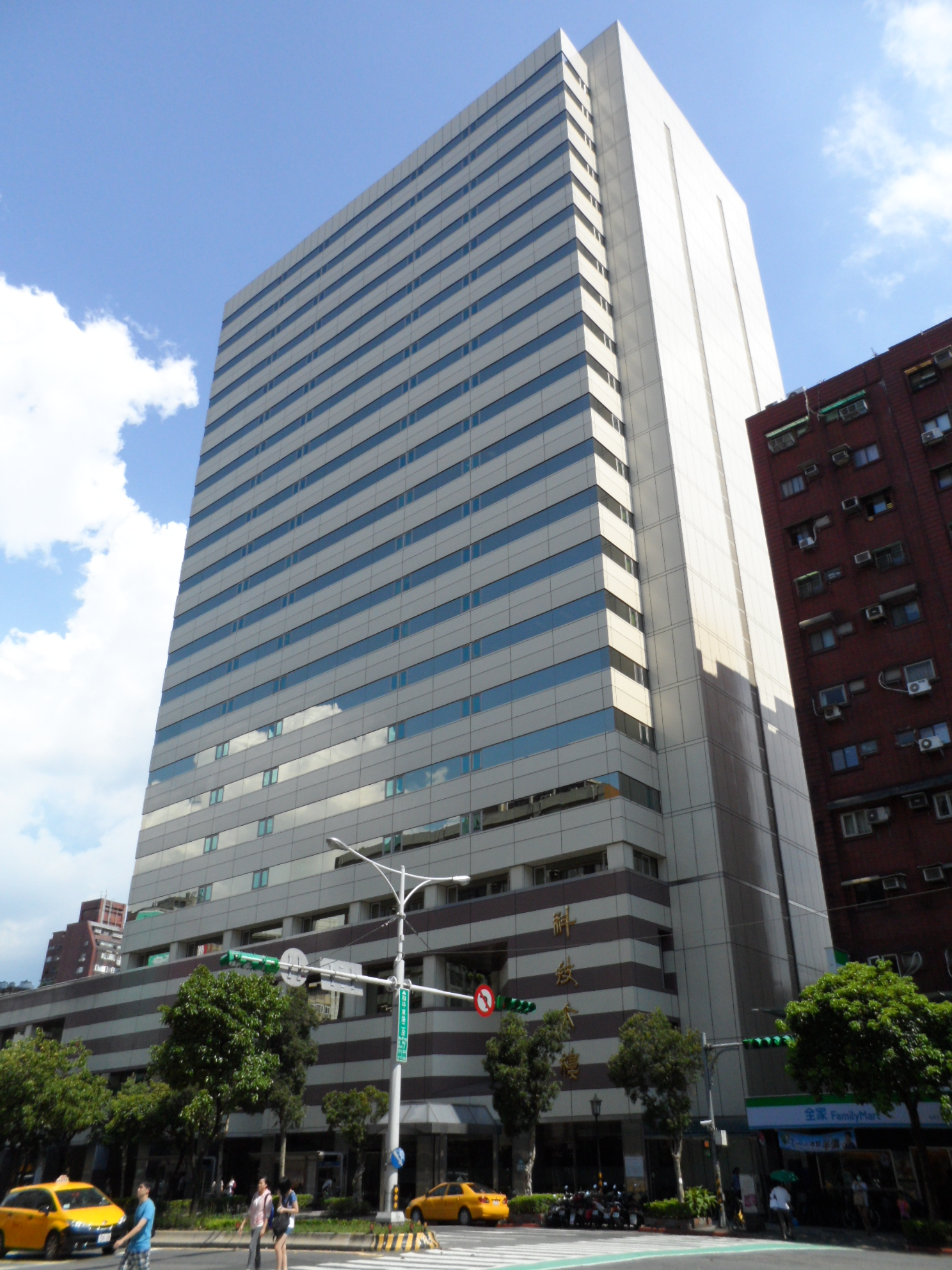
- Established: June 2003
- Laboratory type: national laboratories
- President: Hung-Yin Tsai
- Chairperson: Cheng-Wen Wu
- Location: Da'an, Taipei, Taiwan; 25°01′29.1″N 121°32′31.9″E
- Affiliations: National Science and Technology Council
- Website: Official website

The National Institutes of Applied Research (NIAR; Chinese: 財團法人國家實驗研究院; pinyin: Cáituán Fǎrén Guójiā Shíyàn Yánjiùyuàn) is a research institution in Taiwan resulted from the combination of national laboratories into an independent nonprofit institute. It is located in Taipei. In 2025, it renamed from National Applied Research Laboratories to National Institutes of Applied Research.

== History ==
NIAR was established in 2003 through the merger of a number of existing laboratories and organizations. In 2019 the National Nano Device Laboratories and National Chip Implementation Center were merged to create the Taiwan Semiconductor Research Institute.

Taiwan's growing importance and leading edge in the semiconductor industry in the 2000s allowed NIAR to expand their collaborations with research groups around the world. Collaboration has primarily been in the fields of semiconductors, biomedicine, high performance computing, artificial intelligence, marine technology, information and communications technology, and smart cities.

== Divisions ==
- National Center for Instrumentation Research
- National Center for High-Performance Computing
- National Center for Research on Earthquake Engineering
- National Center for Biomodels
- Science and Technology Policy Research and Information Center
- Taiwan Ocean Research Institute
- Taiwan Semiconductor Research Institute

== Transportation ==
NIAR headquarter office building is accessible within walking distance South West from Technology Building Station of the Taipei Metro.

== See also ==
- National Science and Technology Council (Taiwan)
- Natural Environment Research Council
- Tsinghua Big Five Alliance
- Supercomputing in Taiwan
- Artificial intelligence industry in Taiwan
