= Coastal sun orchid =

Coastal sun orchid may refer to the Australian orchid species:

- Thelymitra granitora
- Thelymitra improcera
