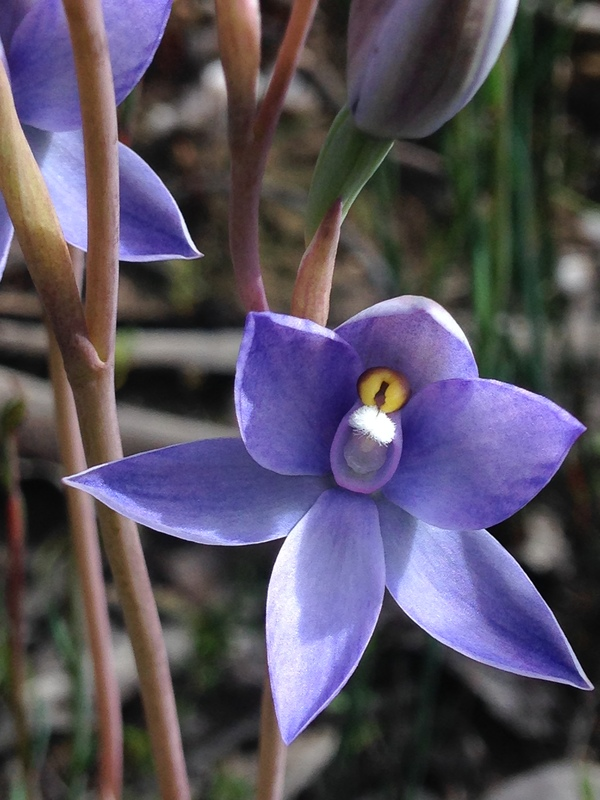
- Near Strathfieldsaye

Scientific classification
- Kingdom: Plantae
- Clade: Tracheophytes
- Clade: Angiosperms
- Clade: Monocots
- Order: Asparagales
- Family: Orchidaceae
- Subfamily: Orchidoideae
- Tribe: Diurideae
- Genus: Thelymitra
- Species: T. megacalyptra

Binomial name
- Thelymitra megacalyptra Fitzg.

Synonyms
- Thelymitra aristata var. megcalyptra (Fitzg.) Rupp

= Thelymitra megacalyptra =

Plains sun orchid

Species of orchid

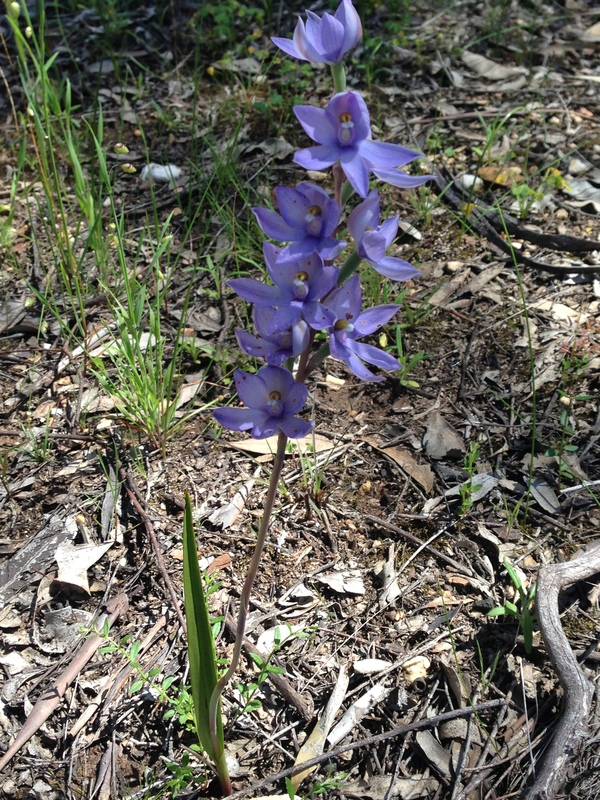
Thelymitra megacalyptra habit

Thelymitra megacalyptra, known as Thelymitra megcalyptra in Australia, and commonly known as plains sun orchid, is a species of orchid that is endemic to eastern Australia. It has a single erect, fleshy leaf and up to fifteen blue to purplish, sometimes lilac, pink or white flowers with white tufts on top of the anther.

== Description ==
Thelymitra megacalyptra is a tuberous, perennial herb with a single erect, leathery, fleshy, channelled, dark green, linear to lance-shaped leaf 100–350 mm (4–10 in) long and 5–20 mm (0.2–0.8 in) wide with a purplish base. Between two and fifteen blue to purplish, sometimes lilac, pink or white flowers 25–45 mm (1–2 in) wide are arranged on a flowering stem 200–600 mm (8–20 in) tall. There are usually two bracts along the flowering stem. The sepals and petals are 15–22 mm (0.6–0.9 in) long and 5–11 mm (0.2–0.4 in) wide. The column is pale blue, white or pinkish, 6–8 mm (0.2–0.3 in) long and 3–4.5 mm (0.1–0.2 in) wide. The lobe on the top of the anther is dark brown to blackish with a yellow tip and a V-shaped notch. The side lobes turn forwards and have white, toothbrush-like tufts on their ends. The flowers are scented, long-lived, insect-pollinated and open on sunny days. Flowering occurs from August to November.

== Taxonomy and naming ==
The plains sun orchid was first formally described in 1879 by Robert Fitzgerald who gave it the name Thelymitra megcalyptra in his book Australian Orchids. The Australian Plant Census and Australian state herbaria retain the name Thelymitra megcalyptra for this species but Plants of the World Online uses Thelymitra megacalyptra. Fitzgerald gave the specific epithet (megcalyptra) in reference to "the large hood of the column, by which it is readily distinguished from T. media".

== Distribution and habitat ==
Thelymitra megacalyptra grows in forest, heath and scrubland, sometimes forming large colonies. It occurs in New South Wales south from the Mount Kaputar National Park, in the Australian Capital Territory, in drier parts of Victoria and in the south-east of South Australia.
