= Whataroa =

- Town
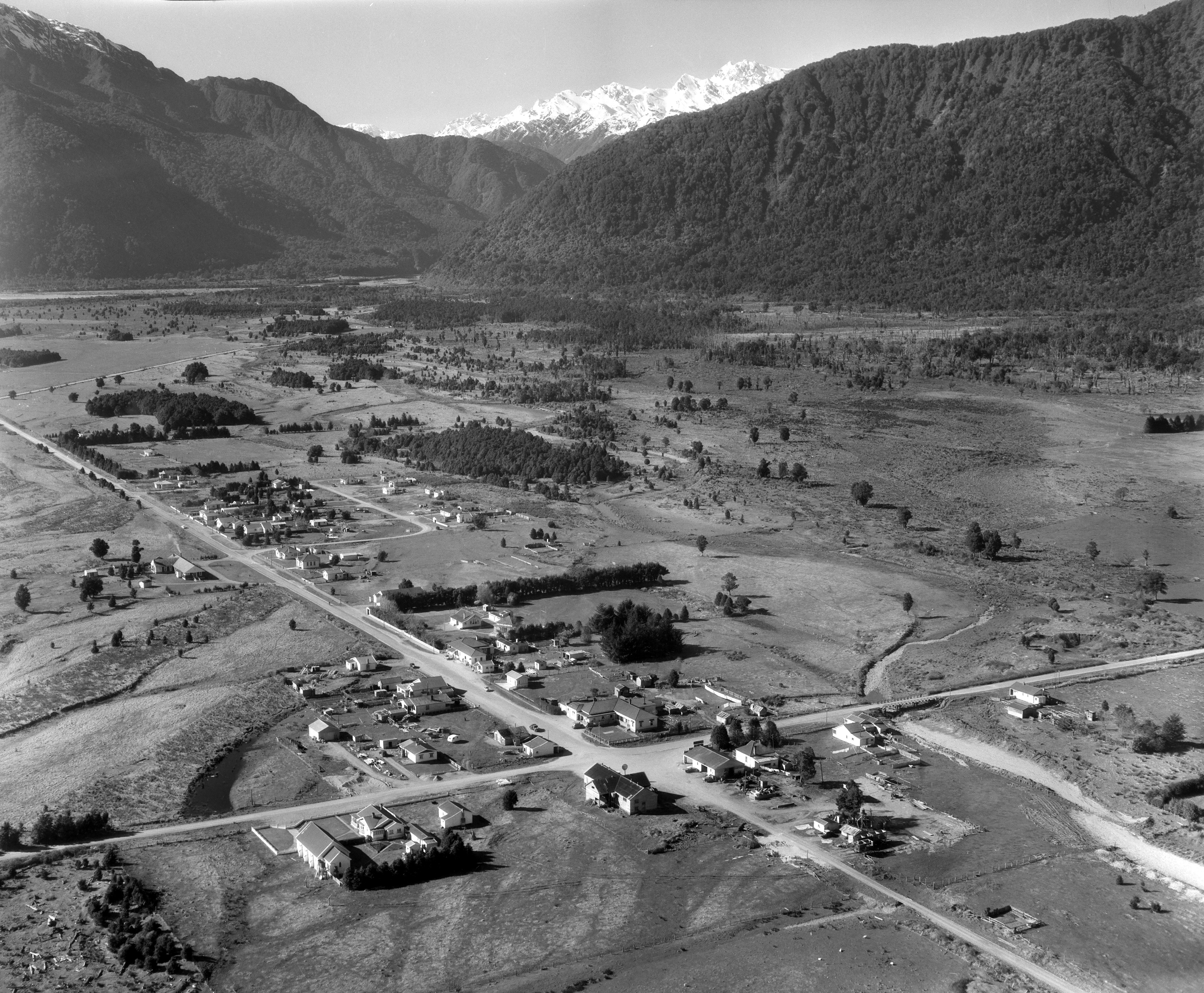
- Whites Aviation photo of Whataroa in 1958

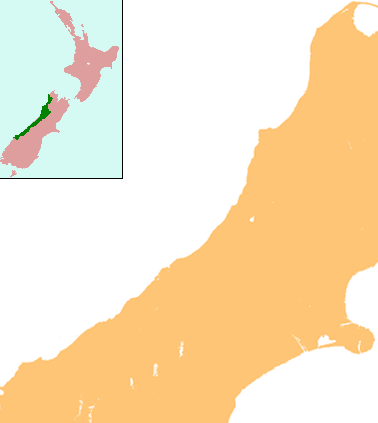
- Location within West Coast
- Coordinates: 43°15′42″S 170°21′32″E
- Country: New Zealand
- Region: West Coast
- District: Westland District
- Electorates: West Coast-Tasman; Te Tai Tonga

Area
  - Total: 64.10 km^{2} (24.75 sq mi)

Population (2023 census)
  - Total: 192
  - Density: 3.00/km^{2} (7.76/sq mi)
- Time zone: UTC+12 (NZST)
  - Summer (DST): UTC+13 (NZDT)
- Postcode: 7886
- Area code: 03
- Local iwi: Ngāi Tahu

Whataroa is a small township in southern Westland on the West Coast of New Zealand's South Island. It is located on alluvial flats to the west of the Whataroa River. State Highway 6 passes through Whataroa on its route from Ross to Franz Josef / Waiau. Hari Hari is 31 kilometres (19 mi) to the north-east, and Franz Josef is 32 km to the south-west.

Whataroa is located in an agricultural area where dairying is the primary activity. The town contains establishments such as a school, two churches, and a dairy and tearooms. Whataroa is the base for tours of the nearby Waitangiroto Nature Reserve, the location of the only breeding colony of kōtuku or white heron (Ardea alba modesta) in New Zealand.

== Name ==
The Māori name of the area was Matainui, still preserved in the Matainui Creek which passes through the town. A post office was built in what is now the centre of the settlement in the 1930s and named the Matainui P.O. but when it was moved to a new building the locals petitioned for it to be renamed "Wataroa" (spelled thus), after the nearby river and flats. Wataroa was the standard spelling of the settlement's name for many years, and is still a common pronunciation by locals. The post office was changed to the official name "Whataroa" in 1951. The Māori word whata means an elevated stage, and roa denotes "long or tall".

== History ==
The history of Whataroa is tied to the gold rush settlement of Ōkārito on the coast, which boomed in 1865–66. Ōkārito was the third-largest port in Westland at the time, supplying other coastal gold-mining settlements, and the inland camps at Waiho and the Forks. By the end of the 1860s most claims had been worked out, and the district's population had dropped from 4500 to 650.

Surveyors had explored the Whataroa area around 1860, and Gerhard Mueller spent three months exploring the inland area in 1866, venturing to Lake Rotokino with his Māori guides and becoming the first European to see the white heron nesting colony on the Waitangiroto River. In the 1870s Harry Friend, a butcher from Ōkārito, began running cattle on the Whataroa flats to supply the gold miners. The area between the Whataroa River and the Waitangitāhuna (called the Waitangi or Waitangitaona at the time) was tōtara forest, swampland, and pakihi clearings, all suitable for grazing. More cattle farmers followed, and an inland track was cleared past the Forks and Lake Wahapo to the interior.

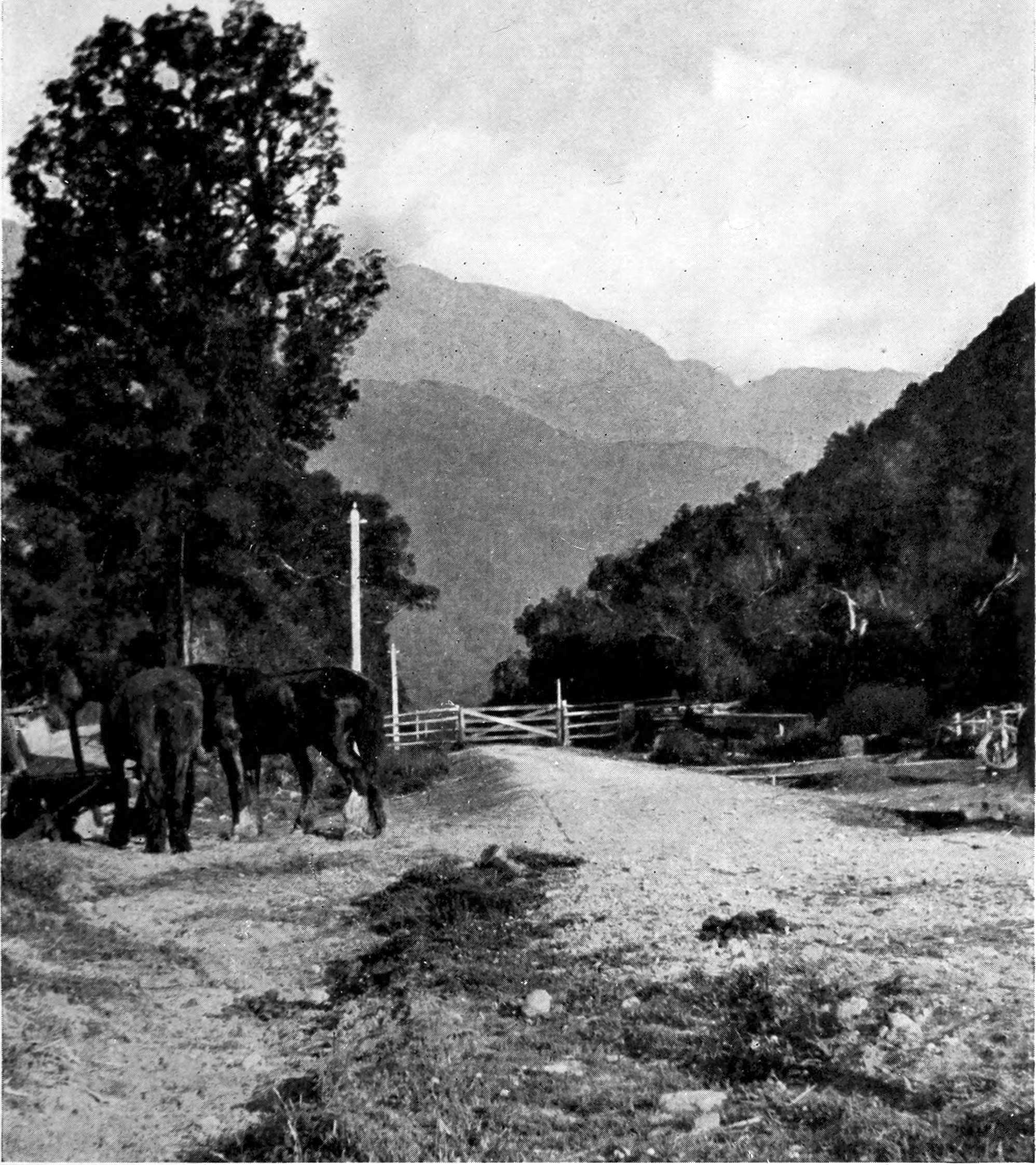
In front of the Wataroa Hotel, 1911

Up to about 1900 the flat land was common grazing for sheep, horse, and cattle, and the settlers cooperated to muster stock in rugged scrub country. The first telephone line to the Whataroa post office was connected in 1897, and by 1900 a new road north across Mt Hercules was built, which created a outlet for farm produce in addition to the port at Ōkārito. Flax mills were set up, and several sawmills operated to clear rimu and silver pine; Paynter Sawmills continued to operate as a significant employer in the town until the late 20th century. A 1904 visit by the prime minister, Richard Seddon, led to the construction of the Whataroa Bridge in 1907–08, at a cost of £11,000. Opening in 1909, it essentially ended the need for Ōkārito as a port.

Early settler Henry Burrough subdivided his land in 1913, and many farmers arrived. Dairying was briefly popular, with a cheese and butter factory being built, but this declined when the settlement turned to raising beef cattle. The first cattle sale had happened in 1912 and in 1915 the South Western Saleyards Company was formed. Cattle farming and twice-yearly stock sales were to play a large role in Whataroa, both as an industry and a social event, with cattle being driven from as far south as the Cascade River in a two-week journey via the Haast-Paringa Cattle Track. After the opening of the road connecting Haast with Otago over the Haast Pass on 12 November 1960, it was possible to use trucks to take stock south to Cromwell, and the last mob of cattle was driven north to Whataroa in 1961.

In the 1930s a new post office was built in what is now the centre of town, at the junction of Main South and Flat roads. Much later it moved to a modern post office building opposite the school. A drapery and butcher shop were built in the 1920s, and a pub named The Better 'Ole opened. The first resident doctor arrived in 1928, and at Te Taho, north of Whataroa, the district nurse Mabel Gunn registered her husband's house as a maternity hospital. It served most of South Westland, and after a visit by the Minister of Health Mabel Howard a five-bed hospital was built in Whataroa in 1953, for which Mabel Gunn was matron for a decade.

In 1937 the Arnold family set up a garage in the former dairy factory with a single truck, and built a new garage in 1945, setting up a freight and transport company that became one of the largest on the West Coast, before merging with Ross Transport in 1972 to become Trans West. At one point the garage supplied electricity for the township, which had no public supply. In the 1930s one proposal was to take water from Lake Mapourika for a hydroelectric station, but this was too costly. In the early 1950s the Westland County Council investigated the possibility of a generator at the outfall of Lake Wahapo into the Okarito River to supply Whataroa. A 1957 town meeting instigated the process, and the Okarito Forks Power Station (later renamed Wahapo) was constructed in 1960, putting out 280 kW. Soon after the district was connected to the national electricity grid. The Wahapo Power Station was rebuilt in 1991 to increase its output to 3000 kW.

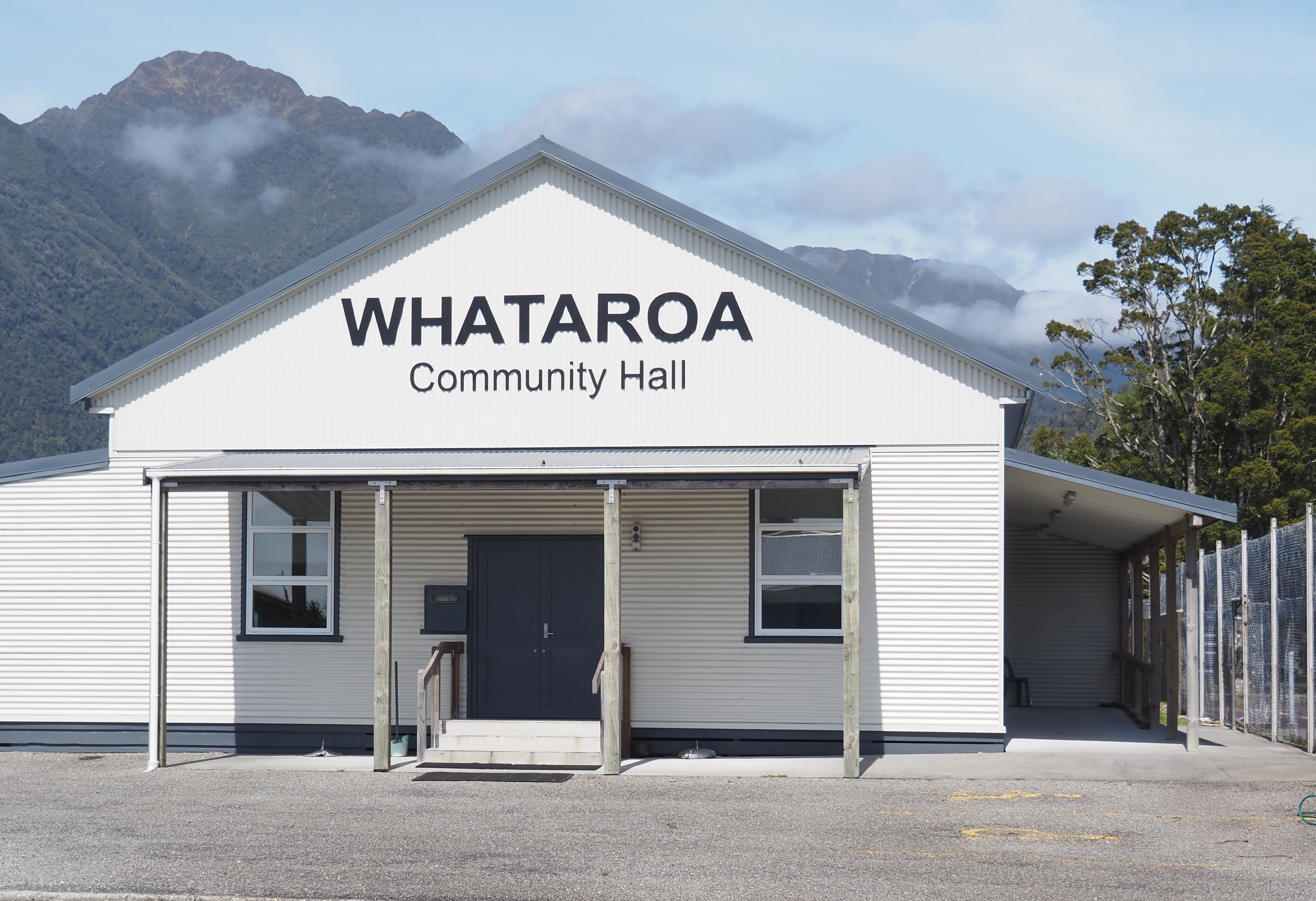
Community Hall

After 1945 clearing and draining of the Whataroa flats accelerated, with better farm machinery, top-dressing of fertiliser, and flood control. A telephone exchange, Bank of New Zealand, RSA Hall, and War Memorial rooms were built. A 1959 report noted Whataroa was "primarily a cattle and sheep grazing area, there being only a limited amount of dairying," but from the 1960s there was a swing back towards dairying as the main land use, as tankers were able to easily transport milk up the highway to the milk powder factory in Hokitika. Cattle sales continued however, with South Western Saleyards conducting five autumn sales each year of 900–1000 cattle each. New bridges were built across the Whataroa and Waitangitāhuna Rivers; the latter river changed course dramatically in 1967, its upper reach flowing into Lake Wahapo which reduced the flow of the lower river and the danger from flooding; stop banks were built in the 1980s to make this change permanent. Sawmilling also played an important role in the town economy, with Paynter's Mill felling native forest and so, as a writer in 1979 noted, "under threat from the attention of the environmentalists".

In 2019, the Whataroa Community Hall, nearly a century old, was refurbished using a $200,000 grant from Development West Coast.

== Demographics ==
Whataroa locality covers 64.10 km^{2} (24.75 sq mi). It is part of the larger Whataroa-Harihari statistical area.

Historical population
Year	Pop.	±% p.a.
2006	234	—
2013	156	−5.63%
2018	183	+3.24%
2023	192	+0.96%
The 2006 population is for a smaller area of 48.48 km^{2}. Source:

Whataroa had a population of 192 in the 2023 New Zealand census, an increase of 9 people (4.9%) since the 2018 census, and an increase of 36 people (23.1%) since the 2013 census. There were 102 males and 90 females in 87 dwellings. 3.1% of people identified as LGBTIQ+. The median age was 49.0 years (compared with 38.1 years nationally). There were 30 people (15.6%) aged under 15 years, 24 (12.5%) aged 15 to 29, 114 (59.4%) aged 30 to 64, and 27 (14.1%) aged 65 or older.

People could identify as more than one ethnicity. The results were 89.1% European (Pākehā); 12.5% Māori; 1.6% Pasifika; 1.6% Asian; 3.1% Middle Eastern, Latin American and African New Zealanders (MELAA); and 6.2% other, which includes people giving their ethnicity as "New Zealander". English was spoken by 100.0%, Māori by 4.7%, and other languages by 10.9%. No language could be spoken by 1.6% (e.g. too young to talk). The percentage of people born overseas was 18.8, compared with 28.8% nationally.

Religious affiliations were 35.9% Christian, 1.6% New Age, and 1.6% other religions. People who answered that they had no religion were 45.3%, and 17.2% of people did not answer the census question.

Of those at least 15 years old, 12 (7.4%) people had a bachelor's or higher degree, 87 (53.7%) had a post-high school certificate or diploma, and 63 (38.9%) people exclusively held high school qualifications. The median income was $36,100, compared with $41,500 nationally. 12 people (7.4%) earned over $100,000 compared to 12.1% nationally. The employment status of those at least 15 was 90 (55.6%) full-time, 18 (11.1%) part-time, and 6 (3.7%) unemployed.

== Geography ==
A 1959 survey described the Whataroa region as 14,000 acres of alluvial flats between the Whataroa and Waitangi-tona (Whatangitāhuna) Rivers, 8 miles long and 2–4 miles wide. In addition there were 7,500 acres of rough grazing flats, 3,000 acres of alluvial fans east of the Whataroa, and 2,000 acres of wetland available to drain. The report concluded:

The soils of this area are generally shallow, friable, sandy, and gravelly loams resting on gravels and sands, the original cover of which was mainly totara, but contain many low-lying wet and underdrained areas merging into shallow wet swamps with remains of kahikatea bush, The whole area is cleared and occupied but pastures generally are not very good, large areas being badly infested with rushes.

Whataroa sits close to the Alpine Fault, an active geological fault that runs almost the whole length of the South Island and forms the boundary between the Pacific and Indo-Australian Plates. The fault passes about four kilometres (2.5 mi) to the southeast of Whataroa, crossing State Highway 6 a few hundred metres west of the Whataroa River bridge. In 2017, scientists reported that they had drilled into the Alpine Fault near Whataroa and found a high geothermal gradient that was, according to one of the lead researchers, Virginia Toy, "likely to be unique globally". Water with a temperature of 100 °C (212 °F) was found at a depth of 630 metres (2,070 ft), whereas water at that temperature would typically occur at depths of more than three kilometres (1.9 mi). The project's lead scientist, Rupert Sutherland, said that the find "could be commercially very significant for New Zealand".

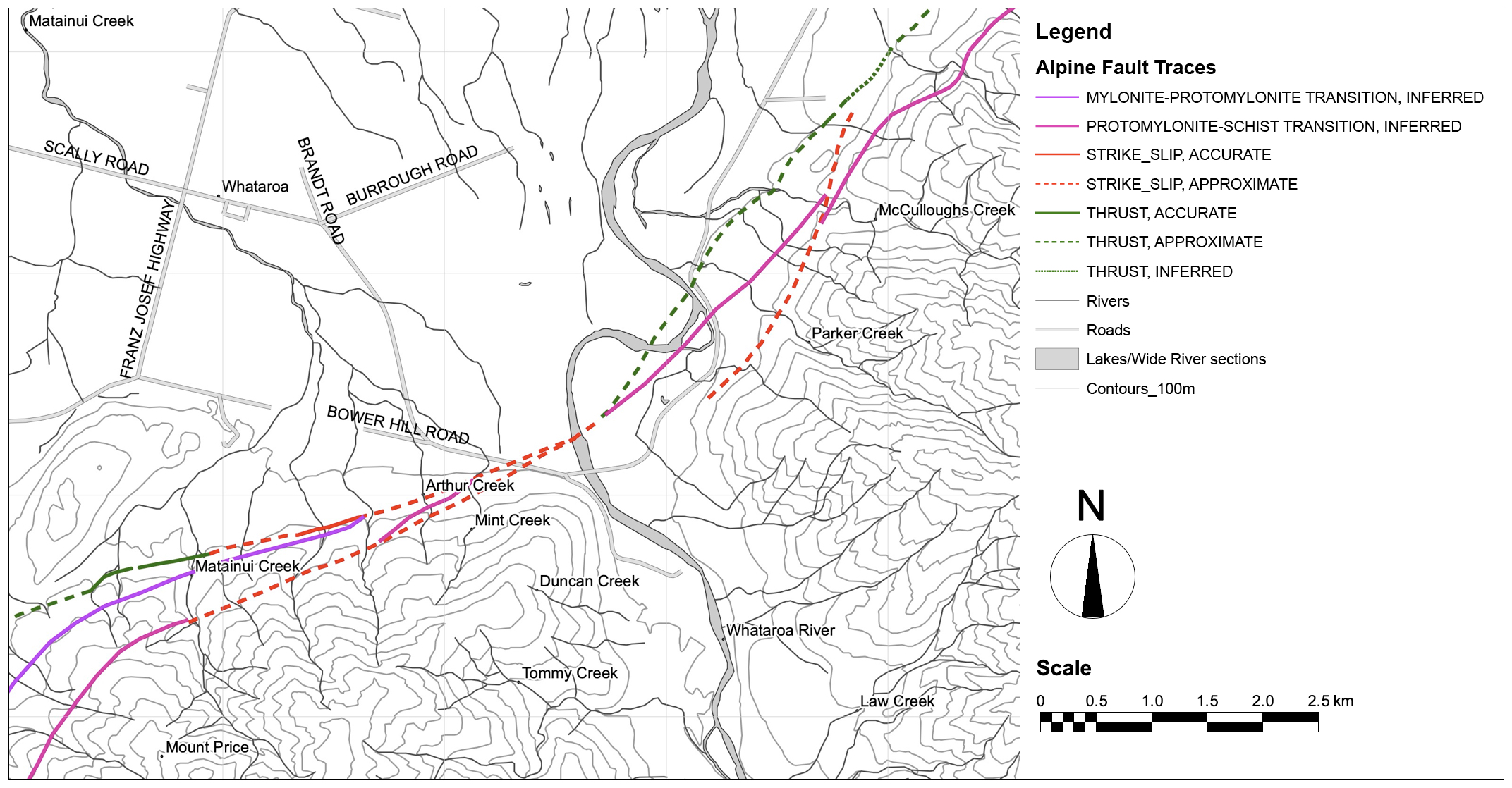
Map showing Alpine Fault traces in the vicinity of Whataroa

== Waitangiroto Nature Reserve ==
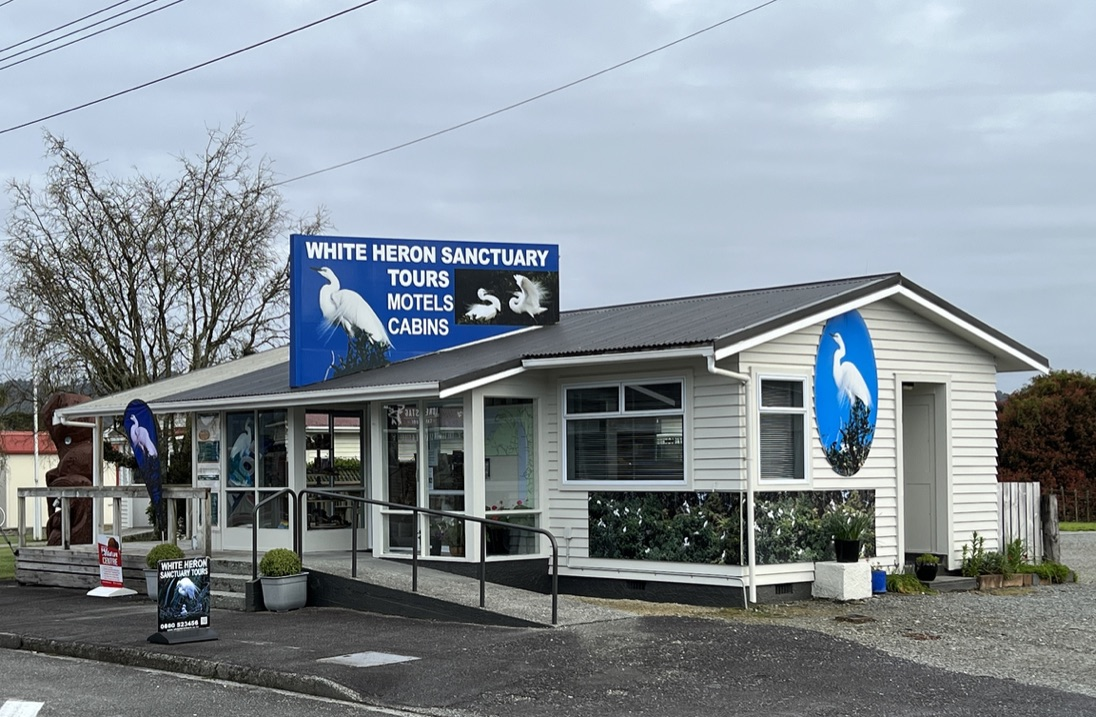
White Heron Sanctuary Tours office

The Waitangiroto Nature Reserve is a 1,530-hectare (3,800-acre) protected area near Whataroa. The reserve consists of lowland kahikatea swamp forest either side of the Waitangiroto River. It is notable as the site of the only breeding colony of kōtuku or white heron (Ardea alba modesta) in New Zealand. The breeding colony is a visitor attraction, but access to the entire nature reserve is by permit only. The colony is often incorrectly called the "Okarito" white heron colony, despite Ōkārito being some distance further south.

White Heron Sanctuary Tours in Whataroa is the only company with a permit to take tourists to the white heron colony. The company was founded in 1987 by the fifth-generation Arnold family of Whataroa. During the breeding season of mid-September to February visitors are taken in a minibus to the edge of the reserve and walk through native bush to a viewing hide, where they can observe the colony. Other birds can also be seen in the reserve alongside the kōtuku, including royal spoonbill and the little shag. The Arnold family assists the Department of Conservation with predator control around the nature reserve.

== Churches ==
=== Our Lady of the Woods ===
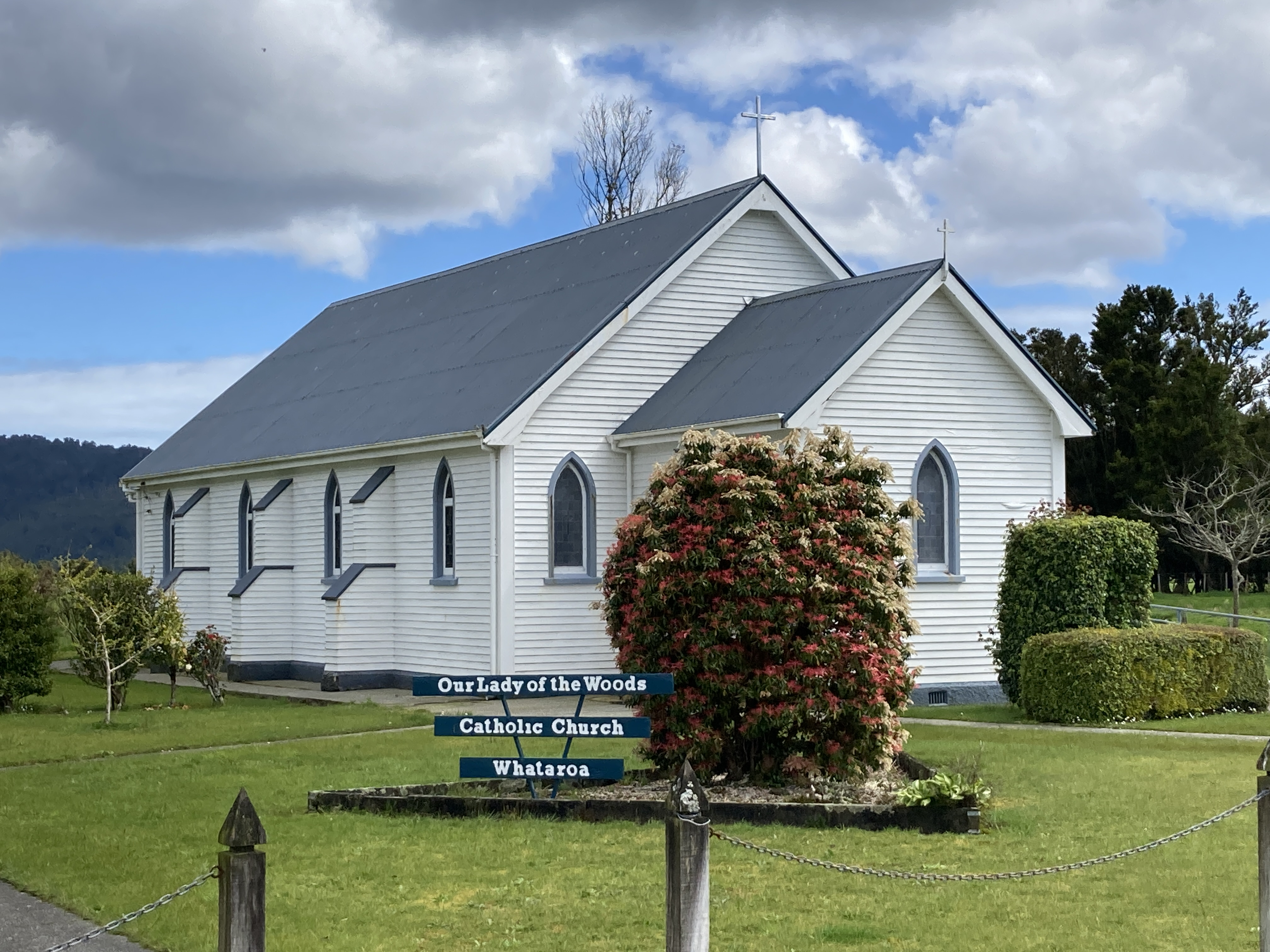
Our Lady of the Woods

Our Lady of the Woods is a Catholic church located at 7 Whataroa Flat Road, Whataroa, within the South Westland parish of Our Lady of the Woods. Mass is held at Our Lady of the Woods twice monthly, on the first and third Sundays.

In the 1880s there were three established Catholic congregations in the parish of South Westland, which was run out of Ross, with a priest undertaking the long journey by horseback to Okarito, Gillespies Beach, and Whataroa at least annually. Father Bogue of St Patrick's church in Ross organised the building of a church on the main road of Whataroa in 1907, on land donated by John Butler and Duncan Scalley. The declining population of Okarito and Gillespies Beach made the churches there redundant, and in 1920 Father John Riordan had to rescue the altar and furnishings from the Gillespies Beach church from cattle that had forced the door and taken shelter.

A new parish centred on Whataroa was established in 1934, the priest being Father James Quinn. The 0.8-hectare (2-acre) site for the present church and presbytery was donated by Mrs Butler, whose husband had gifted the site for the previous church. The Bishop of Christchurch, Matthew Brodie, laid the foundation stone on 22 April 1934, and the church was blessed and dedicated later that year, on 30 September, by Bishop Brodie.

=== St Luke's ===
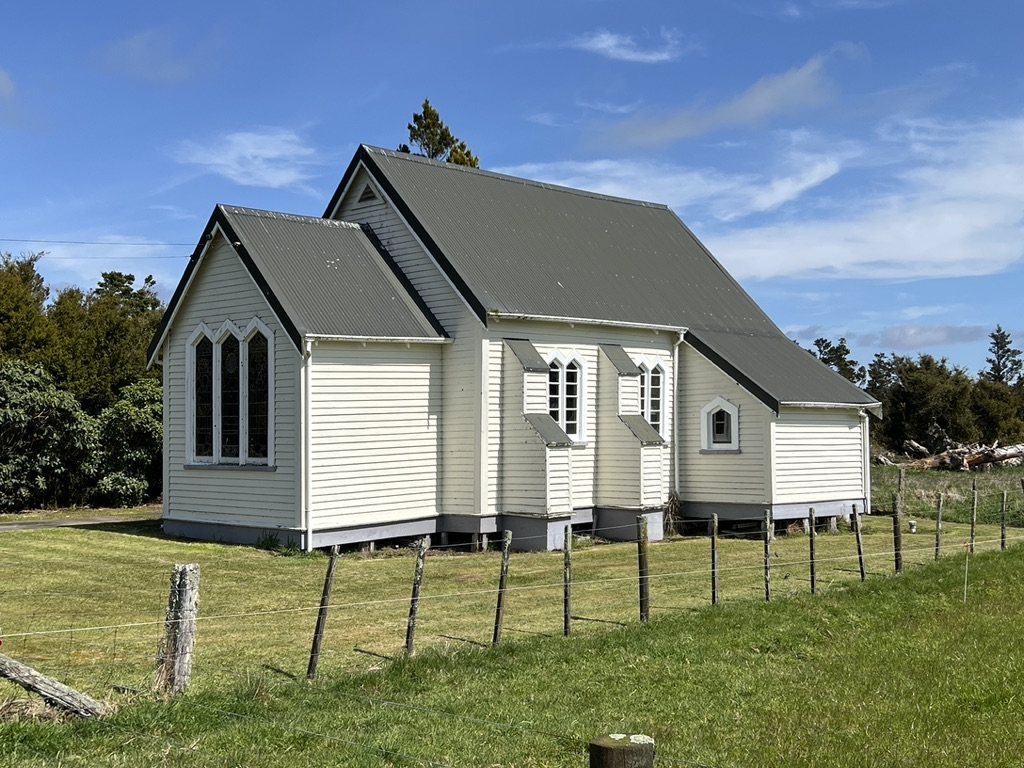
St Luke's

St Luke's Church is an Anglican church in the parish of Ross and South Westland, 0.85 kilometres (0.53 mi) north of Our Lady of the Woods on Whataroa Flat Road. In 1916 funds were raised for a new Anglican church, incorporating materials from the disused Goldsborough church. The church was sufficiently finished at the next annual visit to the West Coast of Bishop Julius for him to dedicate it on 10 July 1919. Completed at a cost of £190, the church includes a three-light memorial stained-glass window behind the altar, donated by Henry Burrough and his sister in memory of their brother Joseph who died while serving in France during World War I; originally in the east wall, the window was moved at the suggestion of Bishop Julius to be sheltered from the prevailing winds. The first couple married in the church were district nurse Mabel Baker and farmer Frank Gunn on 17 May 1921.

A bell was hung in 1923, and removed to a free-standing tower in 1945, when the vestry was lined and buttresses added to either side of the building.

== Education ==
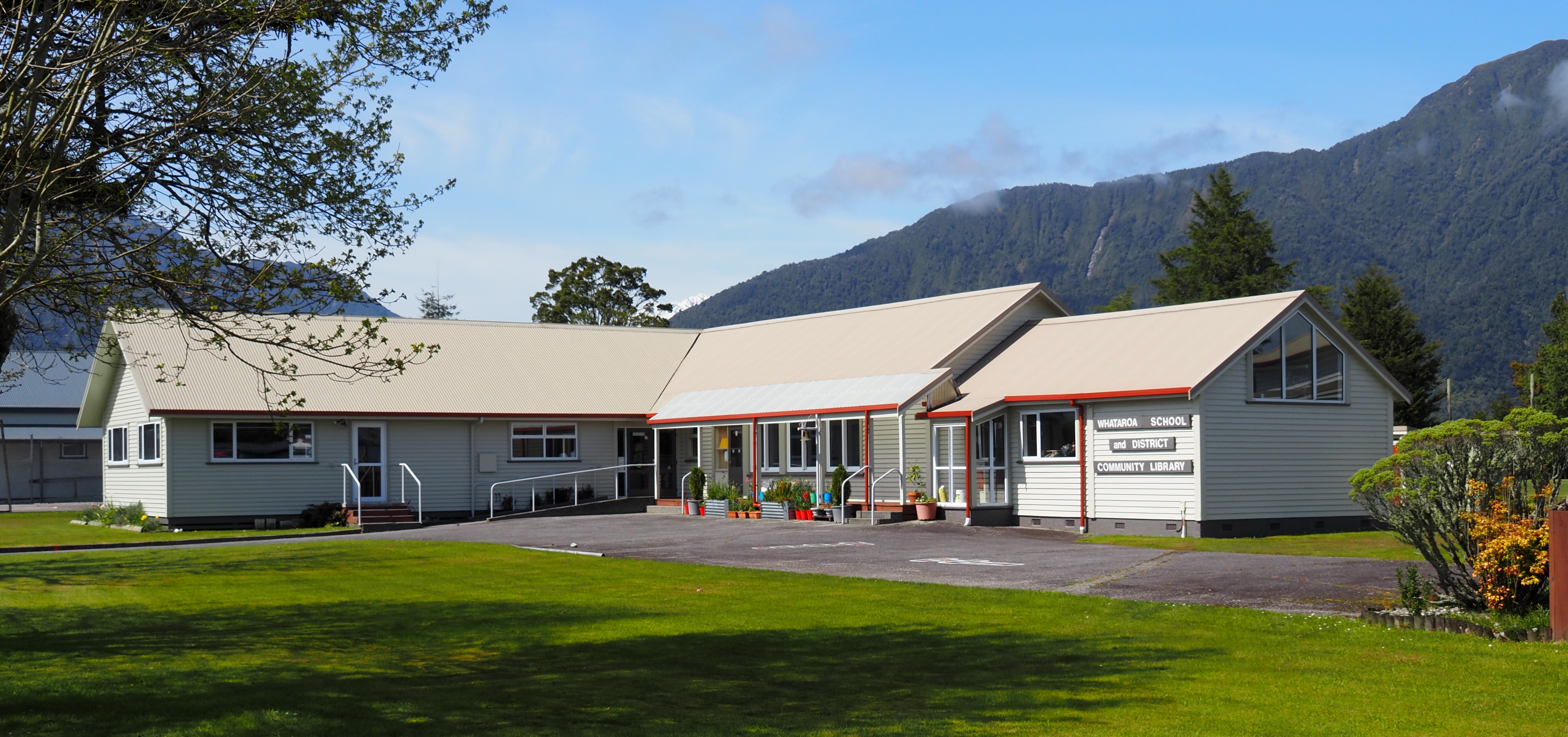
Whataroa School

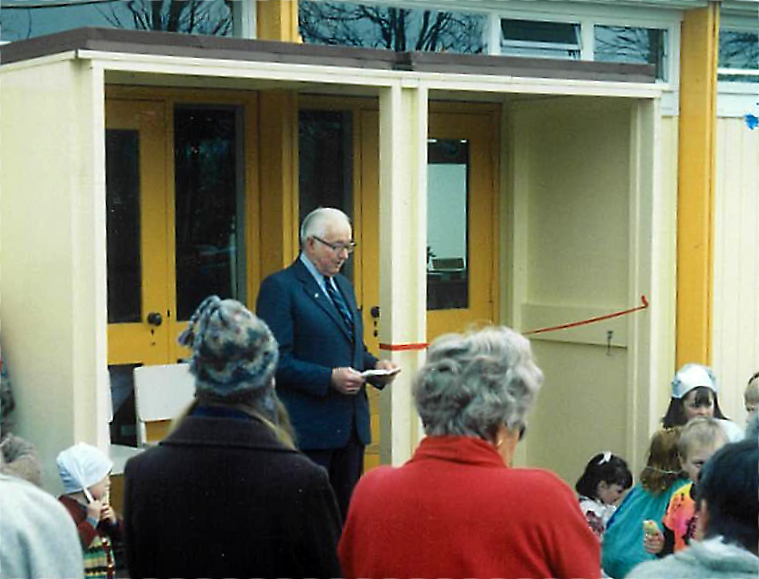
Deputy Mayor of Westland Henry Pierson opening the Whataroa School Community Library, 22 June 1991

The first school in the area opened on 1 July 1879 with 12 pupils on the main road north of the Waitangi (Waitangitāhuna) River. The two-room Waitangi School was used for community activities, including dances.The population of the area was quite low, and the school closed in 1912. School rooms had been operating in the rear of the Forks Hotel since about 1909, and various other household schools operated: one from 1900 at the Adamson residence (Rotikino School) and from 1916 at the Chinn's residence, until the building of the Whataroa School in 1916. The district schools celebrated their centenary in 1979 and their 125th jubilee in 2004. A small school at Te Taho closed in 1947, with pupils then bussing to Whataroa.

Wataroa School, as it was named, was originally sited on the corner of Purcell's Road, and in the 1920s with a roll of 44 and one teacher was moved to the present site. A two-roomed structure was built and a second teacher appointed. By the 1950s the teaching staff had risen to four and the school was renamed to "Whataroa School". In 1962 the old two-roomed building was rebuilt with two classrooms, a staff room, and an office, and in 1965 accommodation was built for women teachers.

Today Whataroa School is a coeducational full primary school (years 1–8), with a decile rating of 7 and a roll of 20 as at July 2026. In the 1970s the school expanded with a dental clinic, pool, and a library in a prefabricated building next to the main school. In 1975 a library was added to the main block, with around 1000 books. It became the Whataroa School Community Library in June 1991; previously there had been a community library stored in a cupboard in the church hall. Whataroa was the first Westland community to merge its community and school libraries in this way.

== Events ==
Sports and competitive wood-chopping events were held regularly in the town centre from the earliest days, as well as the annual Whataroa Races. Whataroa hosts the South Westland A&P Show annually in February. Founded in 1951, events include equestrian competitions, dairy cattle judging, dog trials, trade displays and various family entertainment.

An influx of farmers led to the establishment of the South Westland Rugby Union in 1933. The Woodham Shield is an annual rugby competition in which Whataroa and neighbouring towns, Franz- Fox- Haast, Hari Hari and Ross, compete against each other for possession of the shield. Also founded in 1933 was the short-lived Wataroa Aero Club, which was finally wound up in 1953 and its land handed over for a public domain; memorial gates were installed to honour Constable Ted Best, a founder of the club who was killed in the Stanley Graham shooting.
