= Waitangiroto River =

River in New Zealand

Coordinates: 43°08′S 170°14′E

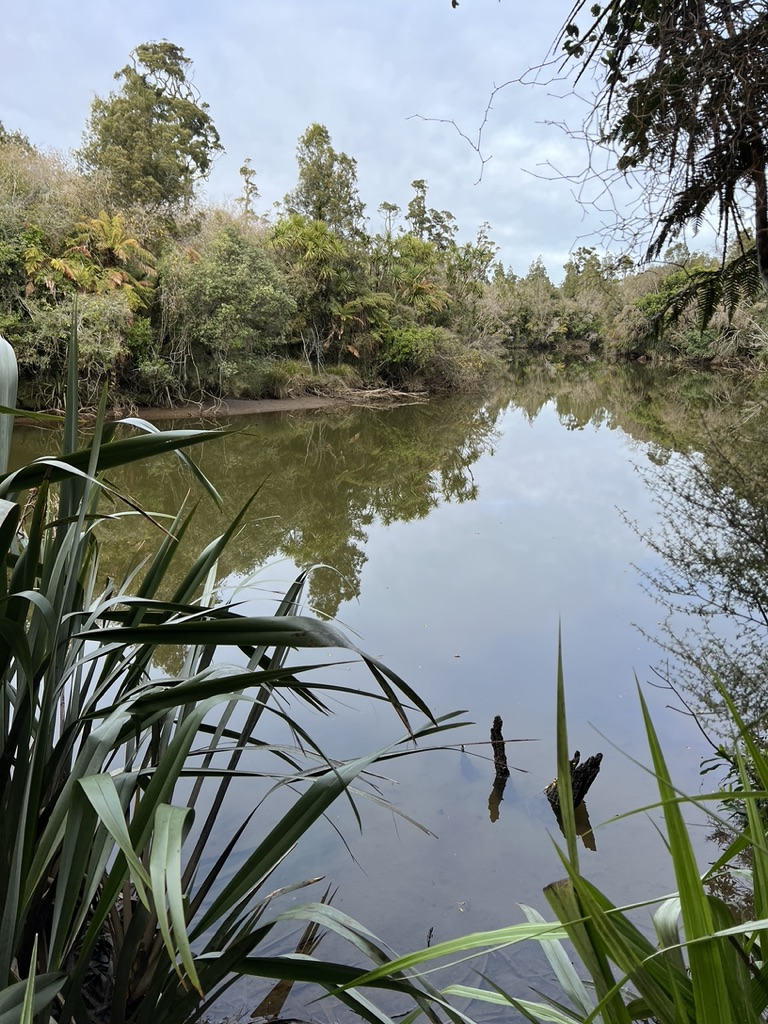

Location
- Country: New Zealand

Physical characteristics
- Mouth
  - location: Tasman Sea
- Length: 17 km (11 mi)

The Waitangiroto River is a river of the West Coast Region of New Zealand's South Island. It is approximately 15 km (9.3 mi) long, with its main source in the Waitangiroto swamp. It flows adjacent to the lower reaches of the Whataroa River and the Waitangitāhuna River. All three rivers enter the Tasman Sea northwest of the Ōkārito Lagoon.

The first European exploration of the Waitangiroto was on 30 December 1865, when surveyor Gerhard Mueller took a waka and paddled up what he called the "Waitangi-Roto", in search of a lake he had been told by local Māori was fifteen or twenty miles inland. He described the river as "quietly running, but very deep" in comparison to the nearby Waitangitoana. Mueller navigated six miles up the river before it branched into many small arms and his route was blocked by fallen trees. He noted there was dense bush on both sides, "beautiful Kowhai trees abounding and almost all shrubs in flower…" He also came across a "cranery": a nesting colony of the kōtuku (Ardea alba modesta):

"Of these birds (near 4 ft. high) imagine seeing around you from 50 to 60, sitting on high pines and lower trees, in a circle of about 150 yards, their pure white feathers shining in the sun. It was a glorious sight—I gave up pulling, and watched the tribe for a long time. They were not at all shy—kept up a continual 'plappering' amongst themselves, and seemed to be astonished at me more than afraid.…I am glad now I had no gun with me—it would have been a pity to disturb this peaceful community."

The Waitangiroto Nature Reserve, located on the river, is the only nesting area for kōtuku in New Zealand. Royal spoonbills and little shag also breed at the site.

In 1967, a major flood caused the Waitangitāhuna River to breach its banks and establish a branch with a new course to Lake Wahapo. The Waitangiroto River changed course away from the lagoon at its mouth and formed a new route to the sea. Both of these changes were seen as significant risk to the white heron breeding colony.

== See also ==
- List of rivers of New Zealand
