= Waitangiroto Nature Reserve =

Nature reserve in New Zealand

- IUCN category Ia (strict nature reserve)
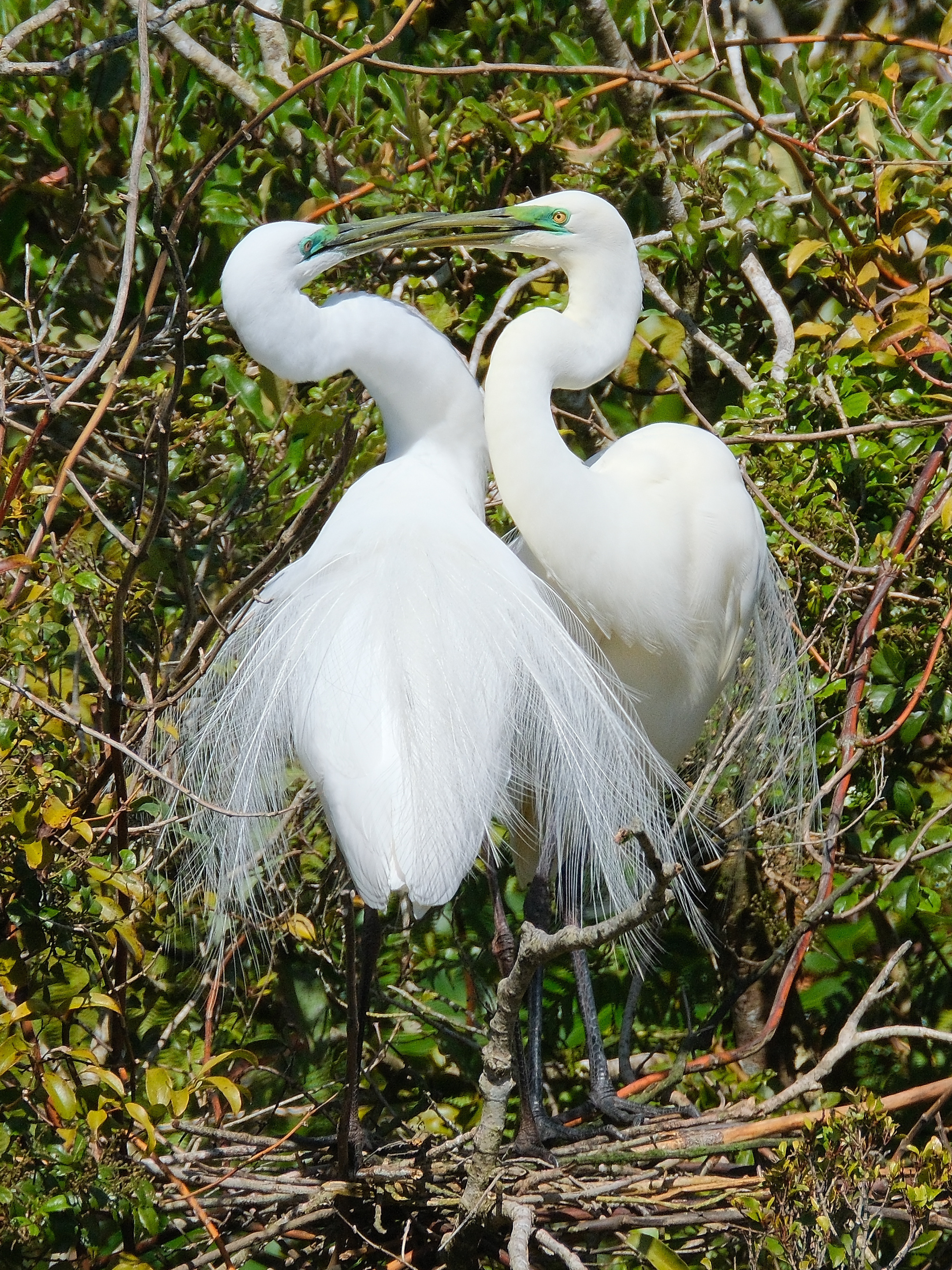
- Kōtuku at Waitangiroto Nature Reserve

- Location within New Zealand
- Nearest town: Whataroa
- Coordinates: 43°08′51″S 170°17′06″E
- Area: 1,534 ha (5.92 sq mi)
- Designation: Nature reserve
- Designated: 1976
- Named for: Waitangiroto River
- Administrator: Department of Conservation

The Waitangiroto Nature Reserve is a protected area of 1,534 ha (3,790 acres) near Whataroa, in the West Coast of New Zealand. The reserve consists of lowland kahikatea swamp forest either side of the Waitangiroto River. It is notable as the site of the only breeding colony of kōtuku or white heron (Ardea alba modesta) in New Zealand, comprising 100–120 birds. Royal spoonbills and little shags also breed alongside the kōtuku. The breeding colony is a visitor attraction during the breeding season, but access to the entire nature reserve is by permit only. Visitors can view the birds from a hide across the Waitangiroto River. Tours of the reserve operate from a base in Whataroa.

Although the kōtuku nesting colony is commonly known as the "Ōkārito colony", Ōkārito is some distance to the south, over a glacial moraine in a different drainage basin. White herons can be commonly seen feeding in Ōkārito Lagoon, a possible cause of the confusion.

== History ==
The kōtuku colony was known to local Māori, and in 1860 they unsuccessfully petitioned the authorities to create a native reserve which included it.

On 30 December 1865 surveyor Gerhard Mueller took a waka and paddled up the "Waitangi-Roto" River, in search of a lake he was told was fifteen or twenty miles inland. A few miles up the river, he came across the "cranery", and described the white herons there in a letter to his wife Bannie:

Of these birds (near 4 ft. high) imagine seeing around you from 50 to 60, sitting on high pines and lower trees, in a circle of about 150 yards, their pure white feathers shining in the sun. It was a glorious sight—I gave up pulling, and watched the tribe for a long time. They were not at all shy—kept up a continual 'plappering' amongst themselves, and seemed to be astonished at me more than afraid ... I am glad now I had no gun with me—it would have been a pity to disturb this peaceful community.

This was the first sighting of the kōtuku colony by Europeans. Six years after Mueller's account Thomas Potts visited and counted 25 nests. In 1876 Augustus Hamilton found only six nests remaining, and because "certain miscreants destroyed a quantity of nearly-hatched eggs", tearing down saplings to procure them, the birds had abandoned the colony; Hamilton hoped the birds would "find a more secure place for their new home".

A short documentary film about the kōtuku breeding colony was produced by the New Zealand National Film Unit in 1954. The film was shown as a preview to Queen Elizabeth II in Christchurch during her five week long visit to New Zealand, after the Queen was honoured with a Māori greeting "Welcome, O stranger from beyond the horizon, the rare white heron of a single flight".

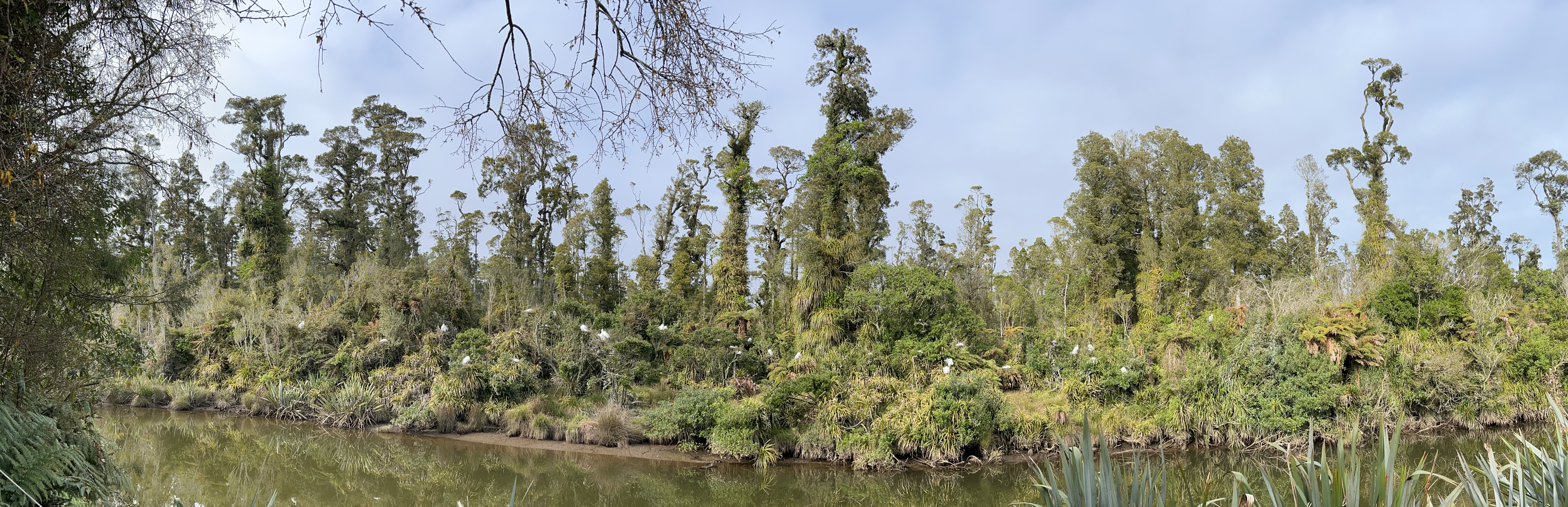
Panorama of the heron colony from inside the viewing hide, at the beginning of the nesting season in October

== Biology ==
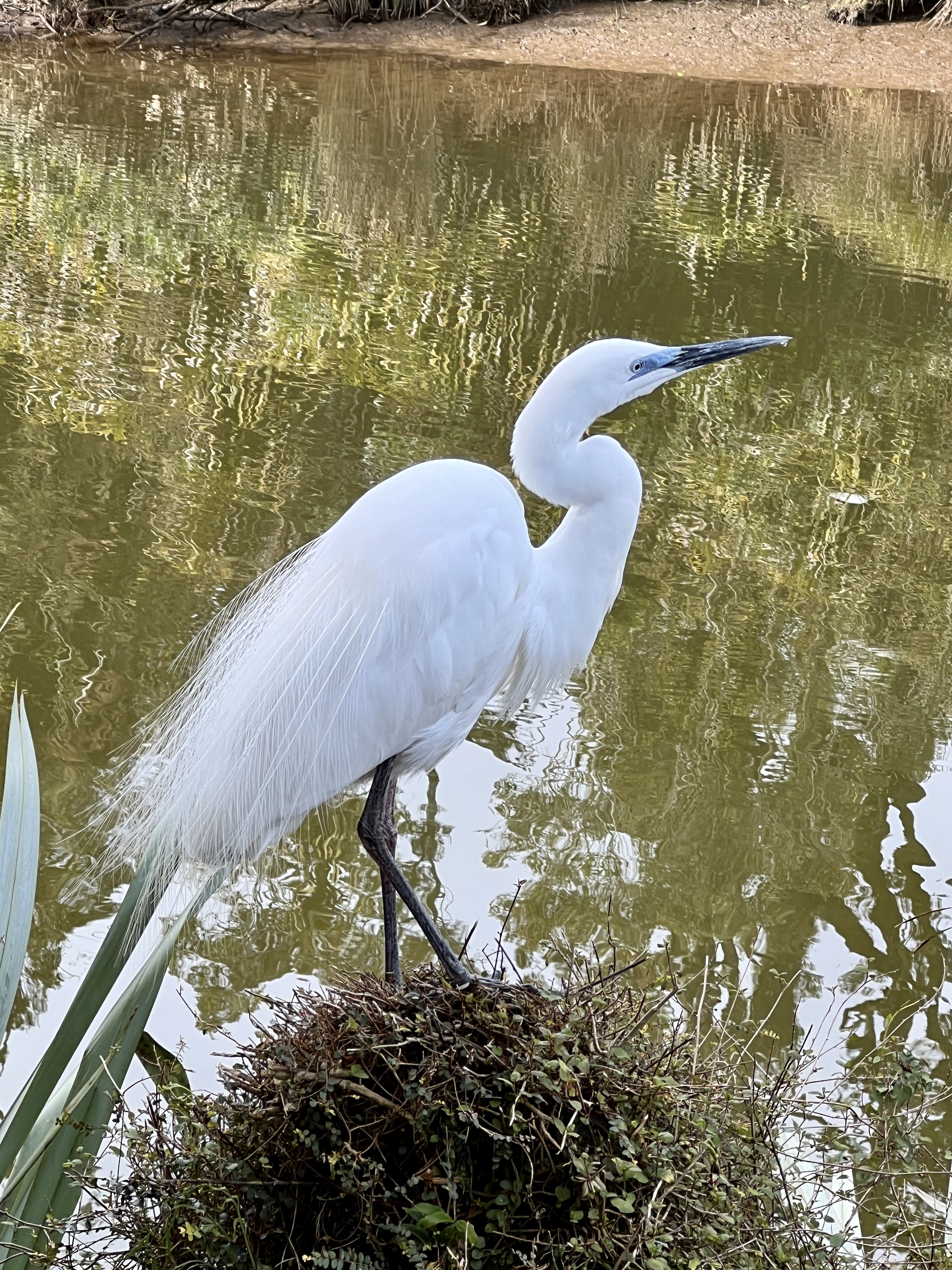
Kōtuku (Ardea alba modesta) from the viewing hide

The reserve includes kahikatea forest, bog, lake, lagoon, and other coastal habitats. Mueller remarked on the dense bush either side of the river, with "beautiful Kowhai trees abounding and almost all shrubs in flower…". At the colony, kōtuku and little shags / kawaupaka (Microcarbo melanoleucos) nest in the crowns of tree ferns (Dicksonia squarrosa), kōwhai (Sophora microphylla), kāmahi (Pterophylla racemosa), and māhoe (Melicytus ramiflorus). Royal spoonbills / kōtuku ngutupapa (Platalea regia) nest higher up in emergent kahikatea (Dacrycarpus dacrydioides) trees. The Waitangiroto River which flows through the reserve is slow, peat-stained, and swamp-fringed, typical of coastal West Coast waterways.

The Waitangiroto Nature Reserve is the only known nesting area for kōtuku or white herons (Ardea alba modesta) in New Zealand. White herons, also known as Eastern great egrets, are common in Australia and South-East Asia but reach their south-eastern limits in New Zealand. The Waitangiroto colony was likely founded by Australian birds blown across the Tasman; it has persisted because Ardea alba is faithful to its place of birth (natal site fidelity) and will return to the same nesting site each year. Outside of the breeding season, the adult birds disperse throughout New Zealand and are solitary.

== Conservation ==
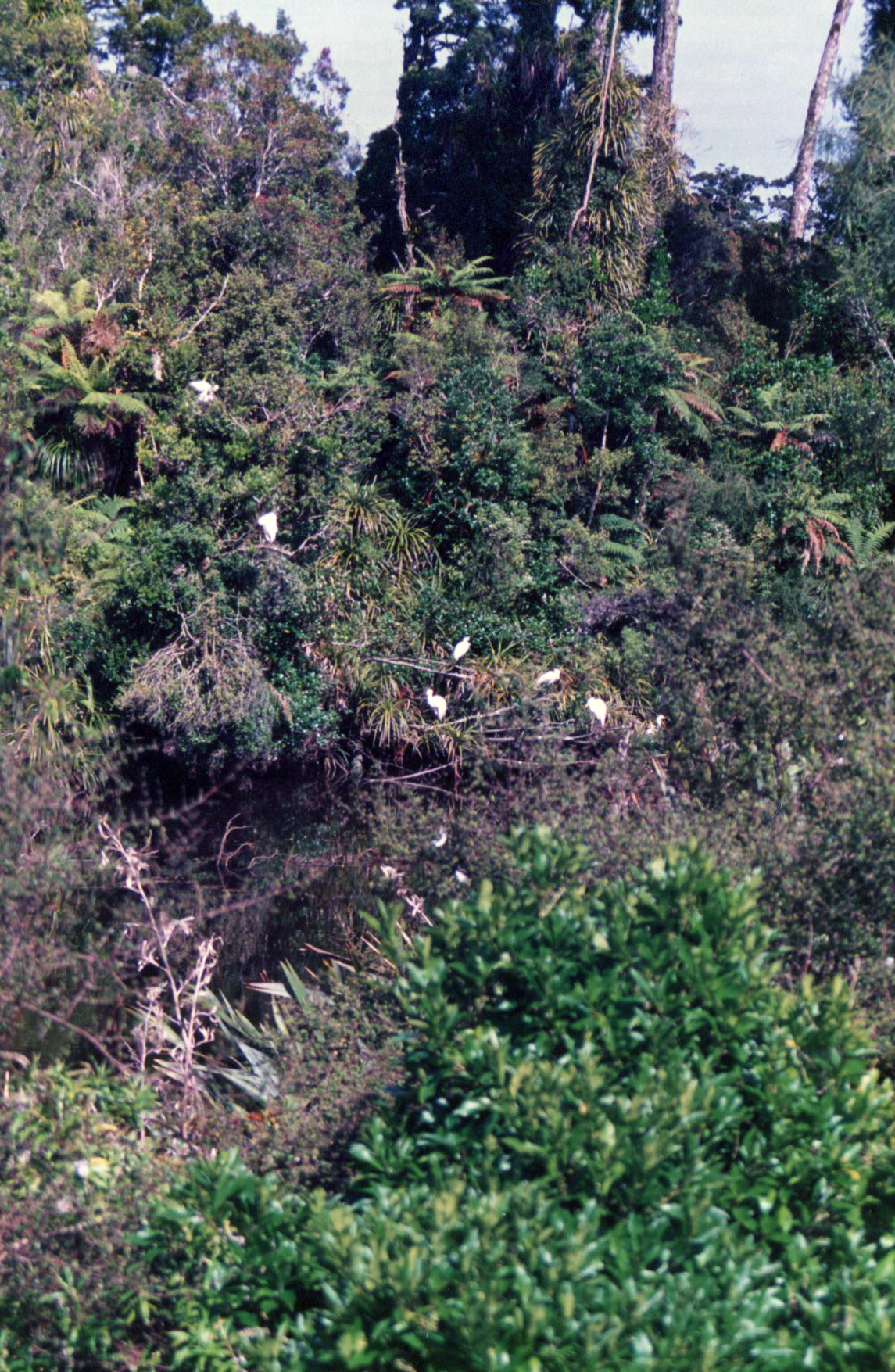
The kōtuku colony from inside the viewing hide, 1991

The first attempts to protect the area began in 1924, when an honorary ranger was appointed to monitor a 60-metre-wide (200 ft) strip on each bank of the Waitangiroto River. By 1940, there were only four nests at the colony. A paid ranger was appointed to monitor and protect the colony and escort visitors in 1944. The area was gazetted as a Waitangiroto Wildlife Refuge in 1957 after an adjacent Māori nature reserve had been acquired. The reserve was reclassified into the Waitangiroto Nature Reserve in 1976, and access to the colony was restricted to by permit only.

In the 1940s around a dozen pairs of herons would nest each year, but the colony numbers are now fairly stable at about 100–120 breeding birds (50–60 nests), following periods of growth in the 1960s and 1980s; 65 pairs were recorded in 1981. On average 0.6–2.0 chicks fledge per nest, with the percentage surviving to fledging gradually decreasing as the colony size increased; chick survival also depends on the frequency of storms and levels of summer rainfall, which has been increasing over the last 70 years. In the breeding season herons feed in the river and nearby Ōkārito Lagoon, and when these are too flooded to easily forage in adults can abandon their nests.

Restrictions on visitor numbers and a full-time warden have kept the colony safe from disturbance. The Wildlife Act 1953 made hunting of white herons illegal, and adult birds have no natural predators in New Zealand, though chicks are preyed on by stoats and Australasian harriers. There are over 150 traps in the reserve, run by White Heron Sanctuary Tours, to protect the colony from stoats, rats and possums.

In 2023, there were 56 pairs of kōtuku nesting in the reserve, an increase compared with recent years. The increase was attributed mainly to the effects of predator control around the reserve. In 2025 there were 54 breeding pairs of kōtuku nesting in the reserve. The predator control programme was leading to an increase in other bird life in the reserve, and new growth of ferns and orchids.

== Tourism ==
In 1986, there were typically less than 100 visitors to the colony each year, most of these were ornithologists. Between 1984 and 1986, the maximum number of visitors was increased to 135 per year. A draft management plan produced in 1986 allowed for the possibility of a tourism operation in the reserve. Because the existing visitor numbers had no noticeable effects on the colony, a concession was granted in 1988 for a commercial operator, White Heron Sanctuary Tours, to take visitors to the reserve. Established in 1987, White Heron Sanctuary Tours is operated by the Arnold family, a fifth-generation settler family in Whataroa. In 1989, the conditions of the concession allowed 6,000 visitors to be taken to the reserve each year. Originally access to the colony was by jetboat down the Waitangitāhuna River to the lagoon, then up the mouth of the Waitangiroto to a boardwalk that led to the viewing station. Both rivers, however, have unpredictable and changing channels, and tourist access was dependent on tides and river conditions. In 2020 the Arnolds negotiated with local landowners to build an access road across farmland to the edge of the nature reserve, and visitors now travel by minibus from Whataroa, and take a short walk through kahikatea forest to an enclosed viewing hide, built in the 1980s on the opposite side of the river so that visitors do not disturb the birds. A study of the effect of visitors on the colony concluded the hide protected the adults and chicks from disturbance on the nest.

About 2500 tourists visit the colony each year during the breeding season—from mid-September when pairs are forming through to the end of fledging in February, after which birds disperse throughout New Zealand. Occasionally over autumn and winter the tourism company has offered tours of the rainforest or estuary for visitors interested in natural history.

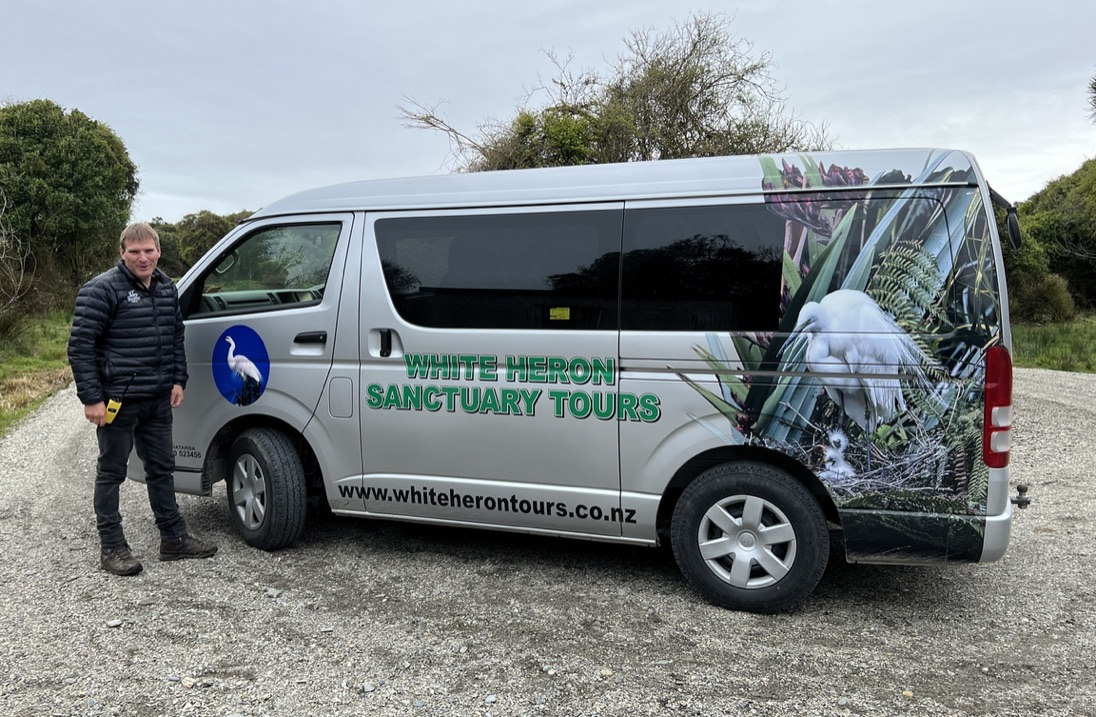
Dion Arnold and the White Heron Sanctuary Tours minibus

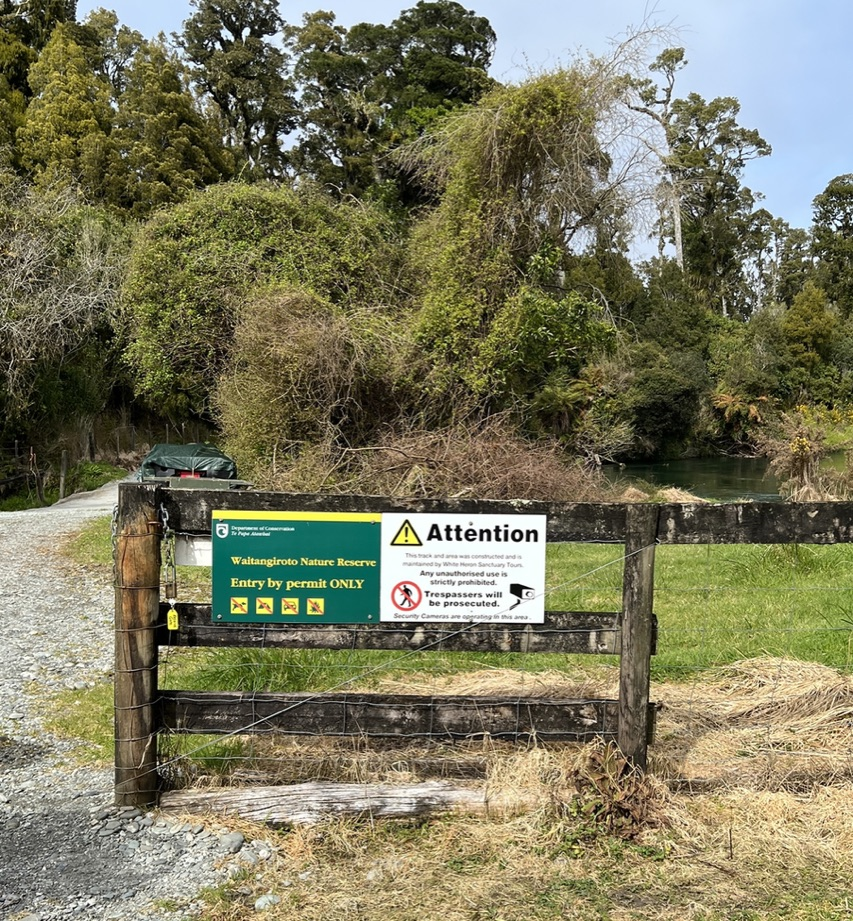
Nature Reserve entrance

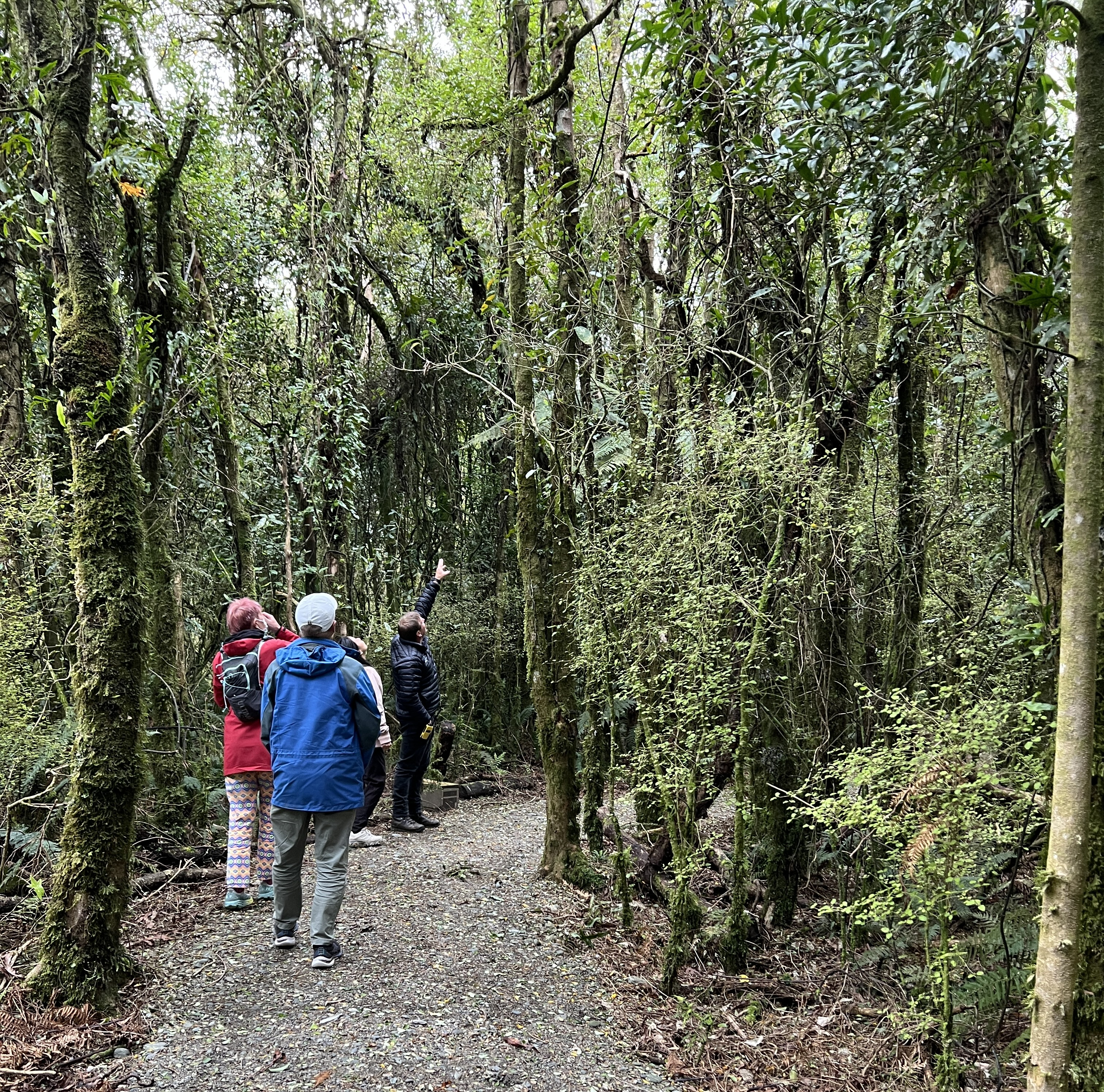
Approaching the colony

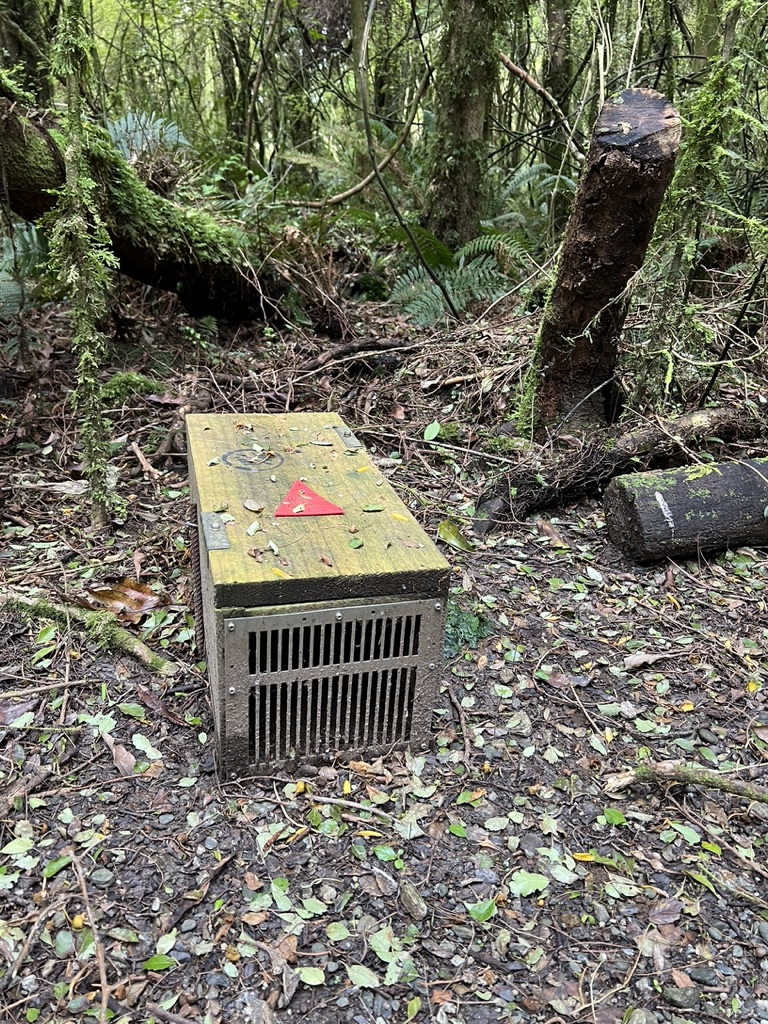
Stoat trap

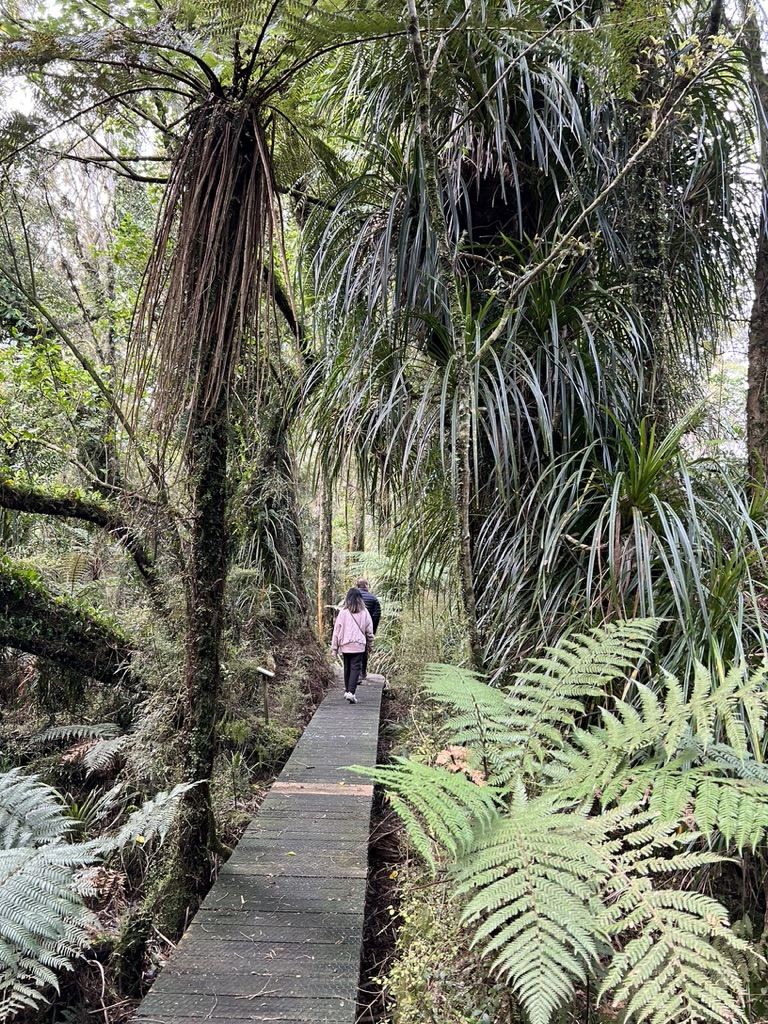
Boardwalk through the forest

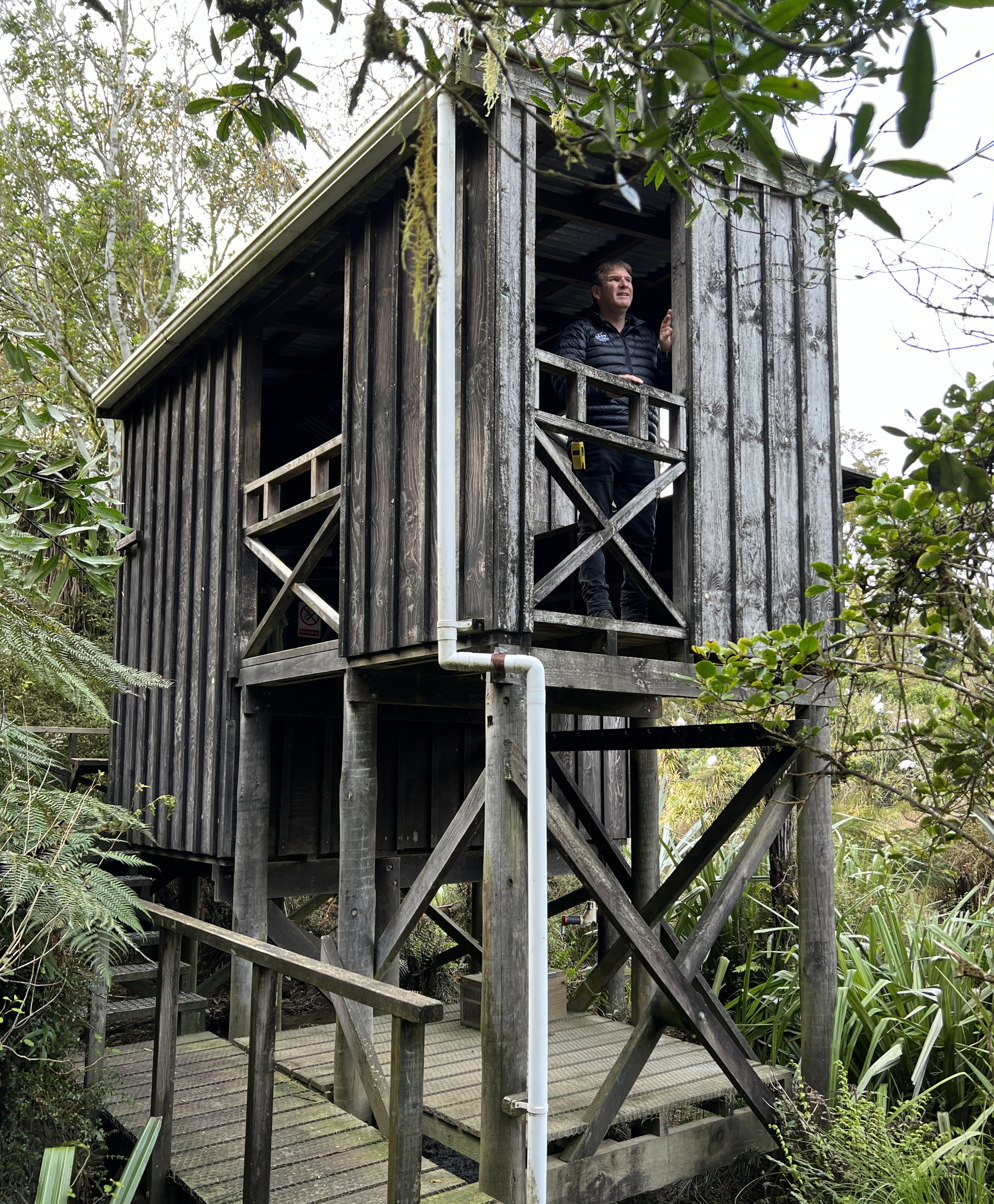
The viewing hide

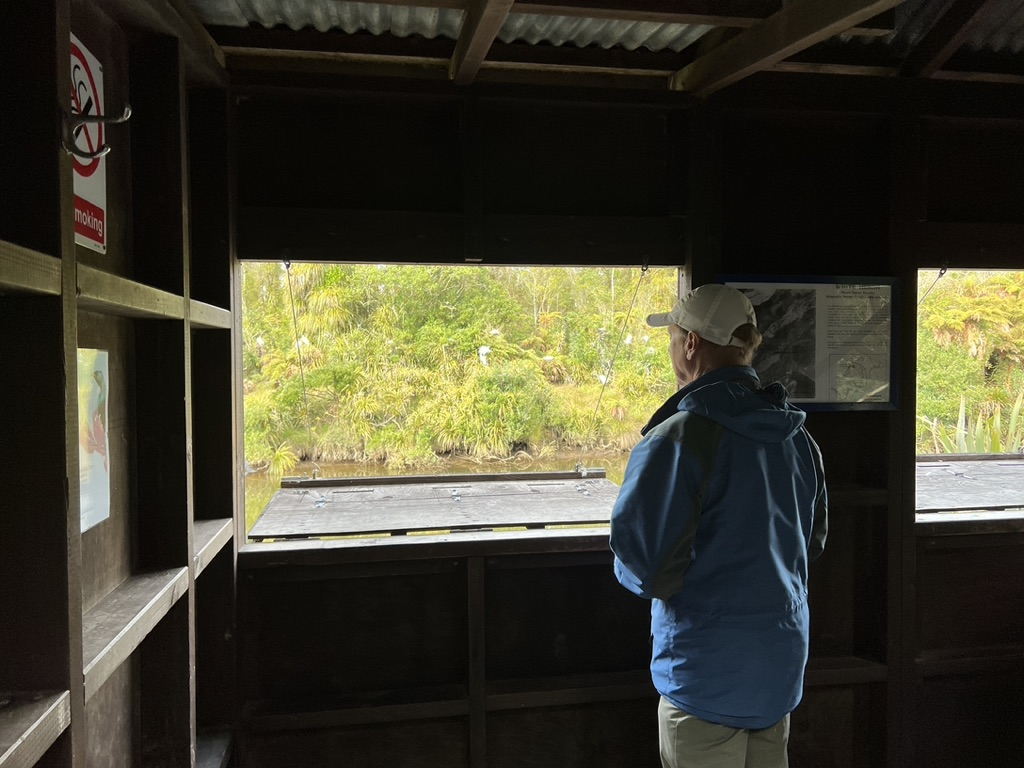
Within the hide

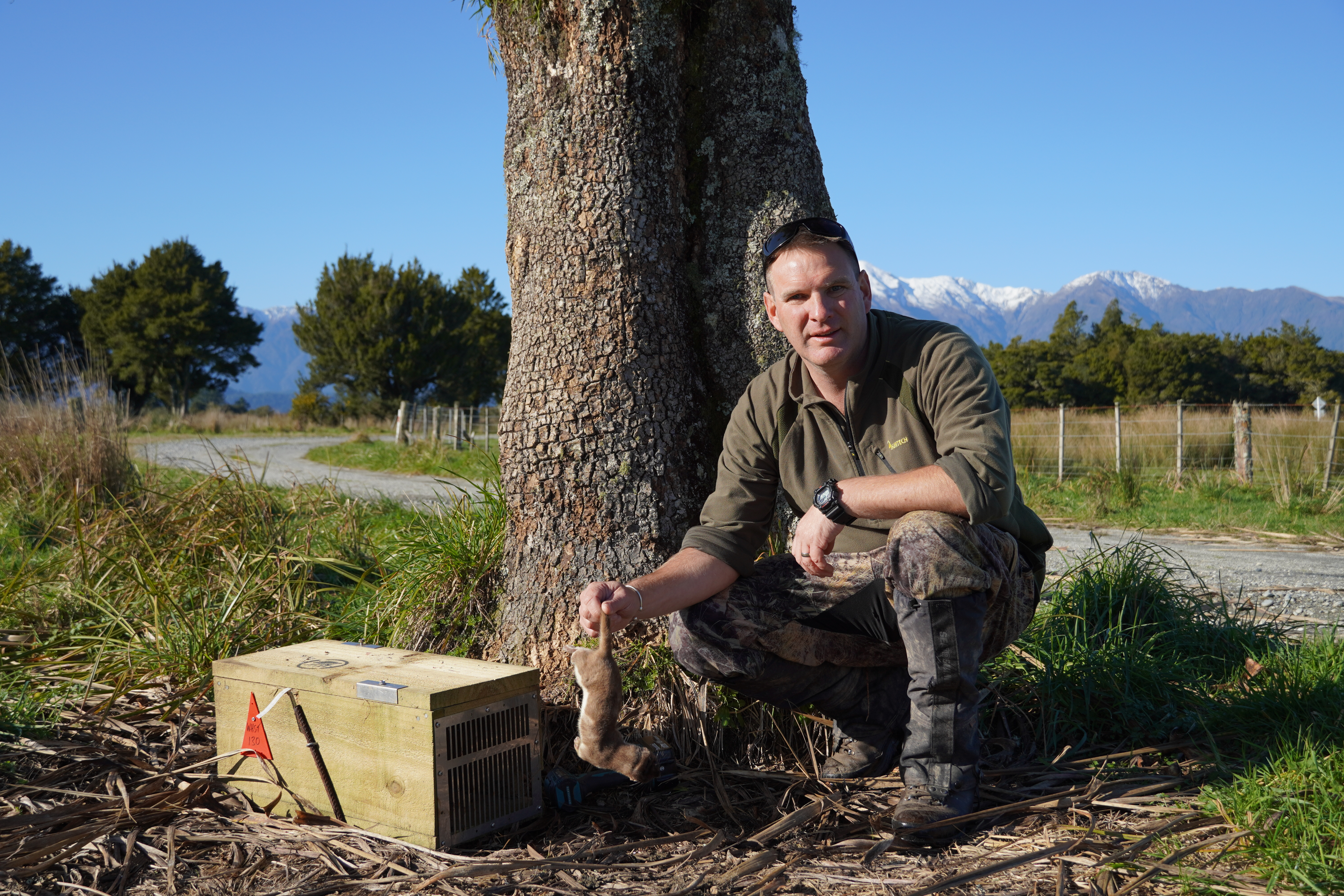
Dion Arnold with a stoat caught in a pest control trap

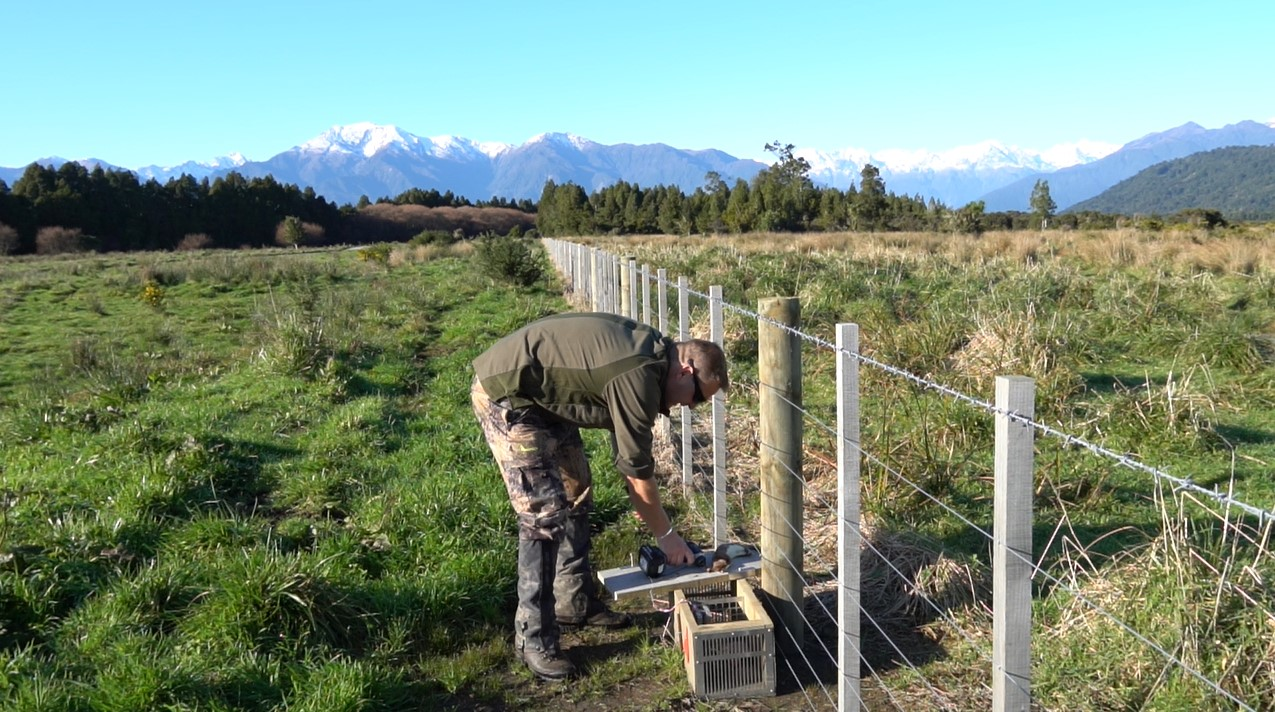
Dion Arnold checking a pest control trap at Waitangiroto Nature Reserve
