= Waitangitāhuna River =

Joint river in New Zealand

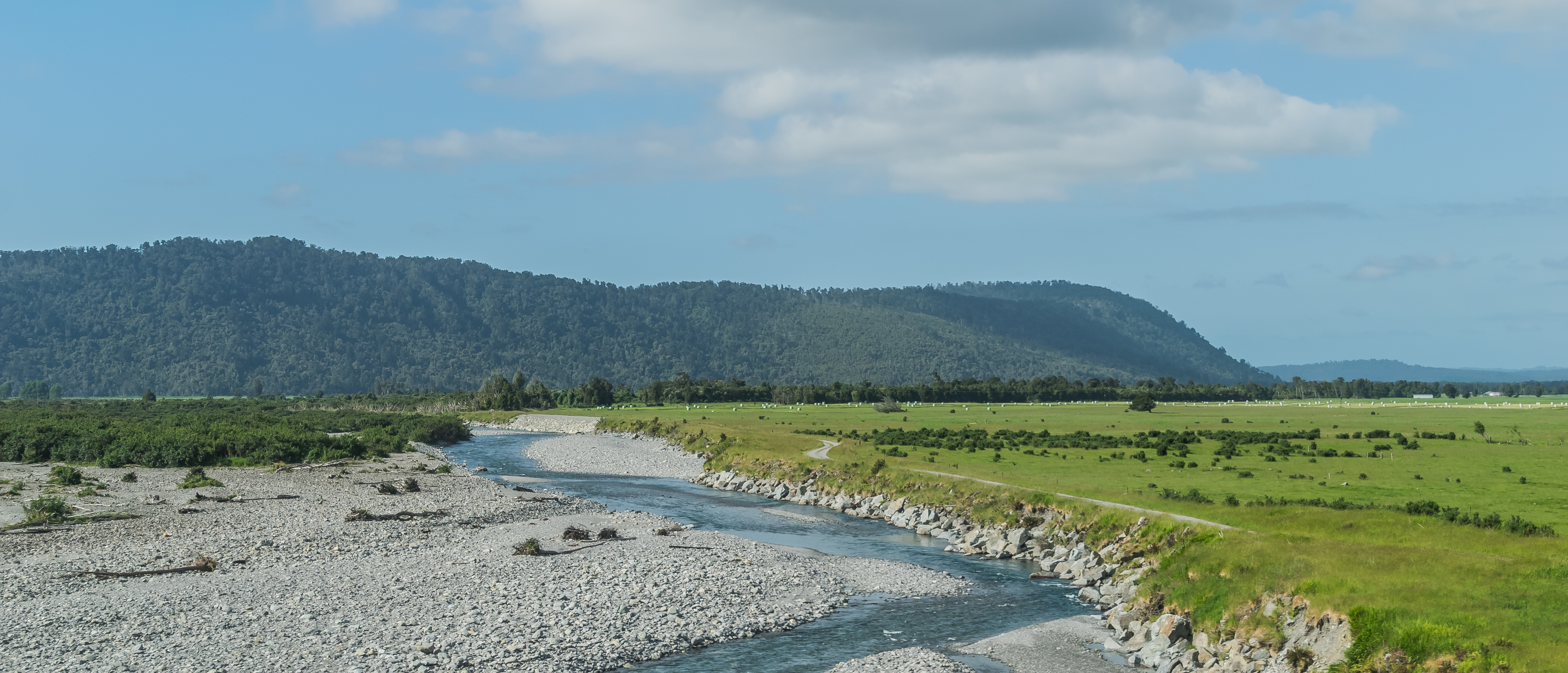
- Part of the southern section of the river viewed from the State Highway 6 bridge

Location
- Country: New Zealand
- Region: West Coast
- District: Westland District

Physical characteristics
- Source
  - location: McFetrick Peak
  - elevation: 2,188 metres (7,178 ft)
- Mouth
  - location: Tasman Sea
  - coordinates: 43°08′17″S 170°14′21″E
- Length: 37 km (23 mi)

The Waitangitāhuna River (formerly called the Waitangitaona River) are two rivers in the West Coast region of New Zealand's South Island. It was a single river until an avulsion in March 1967, when it became two rivers. Since then, the southern portion of the river has flowed into Lake Wahapo, while the northern section discharges into the Tasman Sea north of Ōkārito Lagoon.

== Name ==
In 2018, the official name of the rivers, previously known as the Waitangitaona River was gazetted as the Waitangitāhuna River, correcting a misspelling that had been in use since the middle of the 19th century. Te Rūnanga o Makaawhio, the governance entity for local Māori had initially proposed two different names for the two rivers but, following public consultation, changed its proposal so that each section of the river would have the same name. The proposal was accepted by the New Zealand Geographic Board and the Minister for Land Information, Eugenie Sage.

The name Waitangitāhuna translates from Māori as weeping waters. The earlier, incorrect, spelling of the name was untranslatable.

== Geography ==
The Waitangitāhuna river rises in the snowfields of the Tatare Range, on the slopes of McFetrick Peak, and flows in a generally northern direction. A flood in March 1967 caused an avulsion of the river, with the river's flow being redirected across an ancient alluvial fan into Lake Wahapo, 6 kilometres (3.7 mi) from its previous course. Previously the river had continued flowing north, between the Waitangiroto and Whataroa Rivers, with all three rivers emptying into the same lagoon with a single channel to the Tasman Sea.

Following the 1967 avulsion, some of the flow from the alluvial fan was into Graham Creek and then back into the original bed of the river and to the Tasman Sea. Stopbanks constructed on the alluvial fan in the 1980s, to prevent the southern section of the river returning to its previous course, mean that the northern river is no longer fed by the southern river.

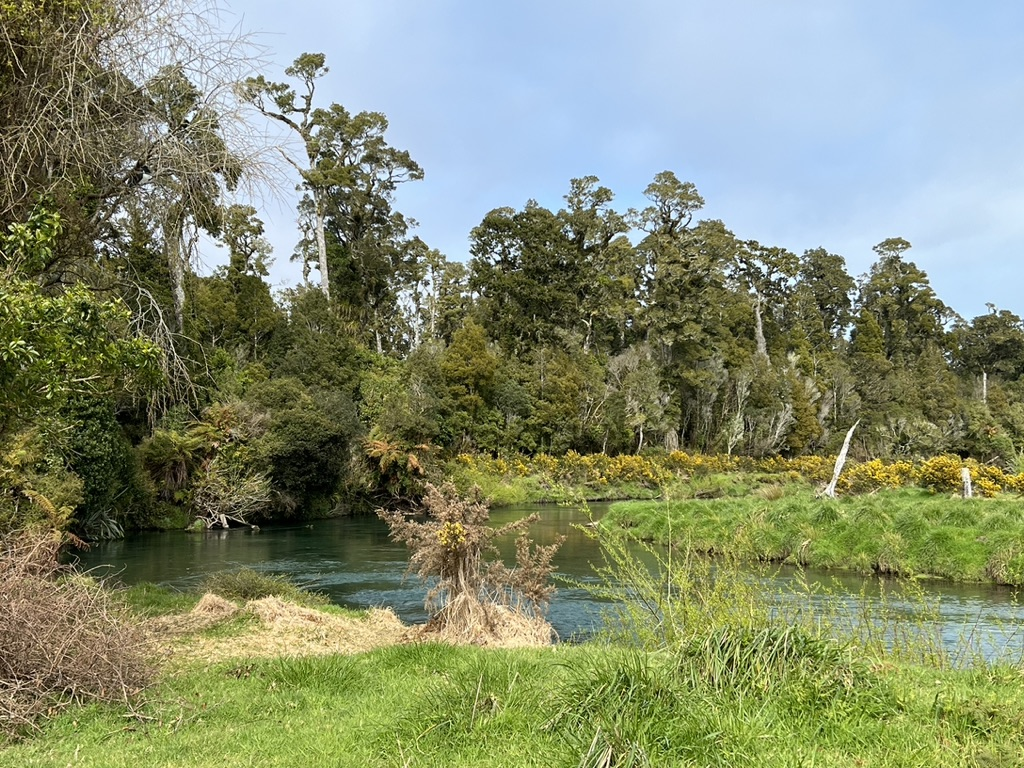
The Waitangitāhuna near the sea at the edge of the Waitangiroto Nature Reserve

The southern section of the river flows for about 21 kilometres (13 mi) from its headwaters to Lake Wahapo, and includes a 57-metre-high (187 ft) waterfall. From Lake Wahapo the water runs through Trustpower's 3.1 MW Wahapo hydroelectric power station, first commissioned in 1960, to the Ōkārito River. A bridge on SH 6, 5.8 kilometres (3.6 mi) southwest of Whataroa is the only bridge over the river.

The northern section of the river, flows generally north then westwards for approximately 28 kilometres (17 mi) from its source at the confluence of Graham Creek and Matainui Creek (which flows through Whataroa) to its mouth at the Tasman Sea, just north of Ōkārito Lagoon. The shorter Waitangiroto River follows a course roughly parallel to that the lower Waitangitāhuna, one kilometre to the south. By August 1967, the Whataroa River had formed its own channel to the sea, and now reaches the Tasman 2 km (1.2 mi) to the north of mouth of the Waitangitāhuna River.

== See also ==
- List of rivers of New Zealand
