= Gerhard Mueller (engineer) =

New Zealand surveyor, engineer and land commissioner

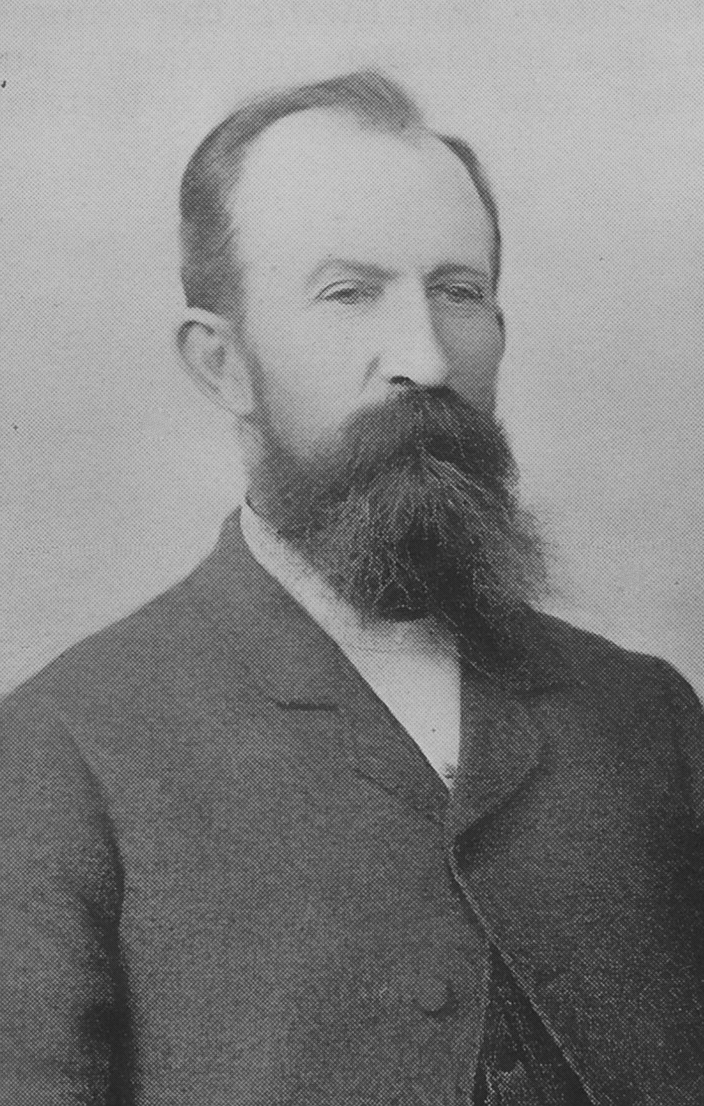
- Born: 7 February 1835; Darmstadt, Grand Duchy of Hesse, Germany
- Died: 20 February 1918 (aged 83); Auckland, New Zealand
- Occupations: Surveyor; engineer; land commissioner
- Known for: First European to record the kōtuku nesting ground at Waitangiroto
- Spouse: Elizabeth Bannatyne McArthur (m. 1862; died 1915)
- Children: 7

Gerhard Mueller (7 February 1835 – 20 February 1918) was a notable New Zealand surveyor, engineer and land commissioner. He was born in Darmstadt, Germany, on 7 February 1835.

The Mueller Pass on the West Coast between the Burke River and Princes Creek is named after him.
