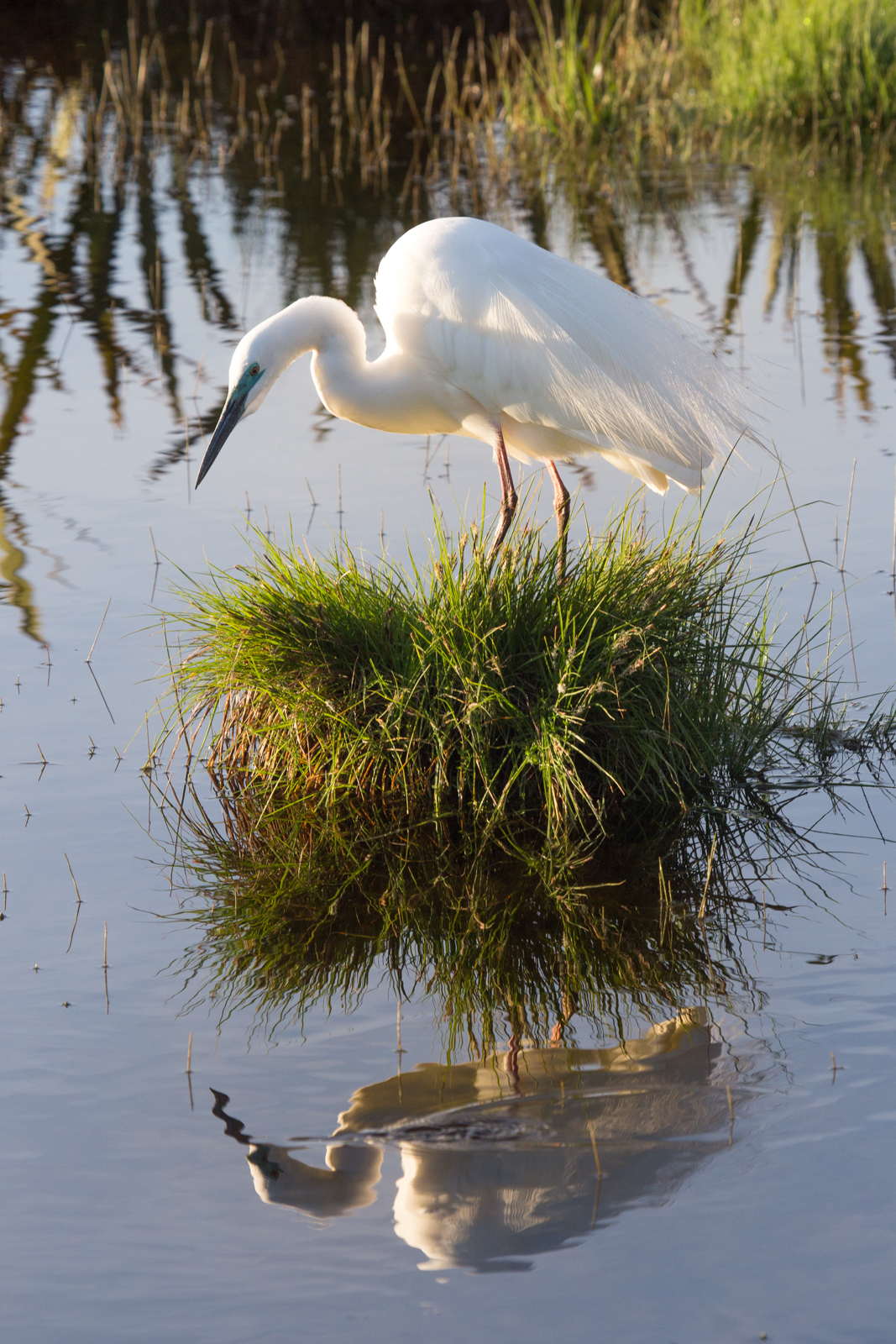
- Breeding plumage in New Zealand
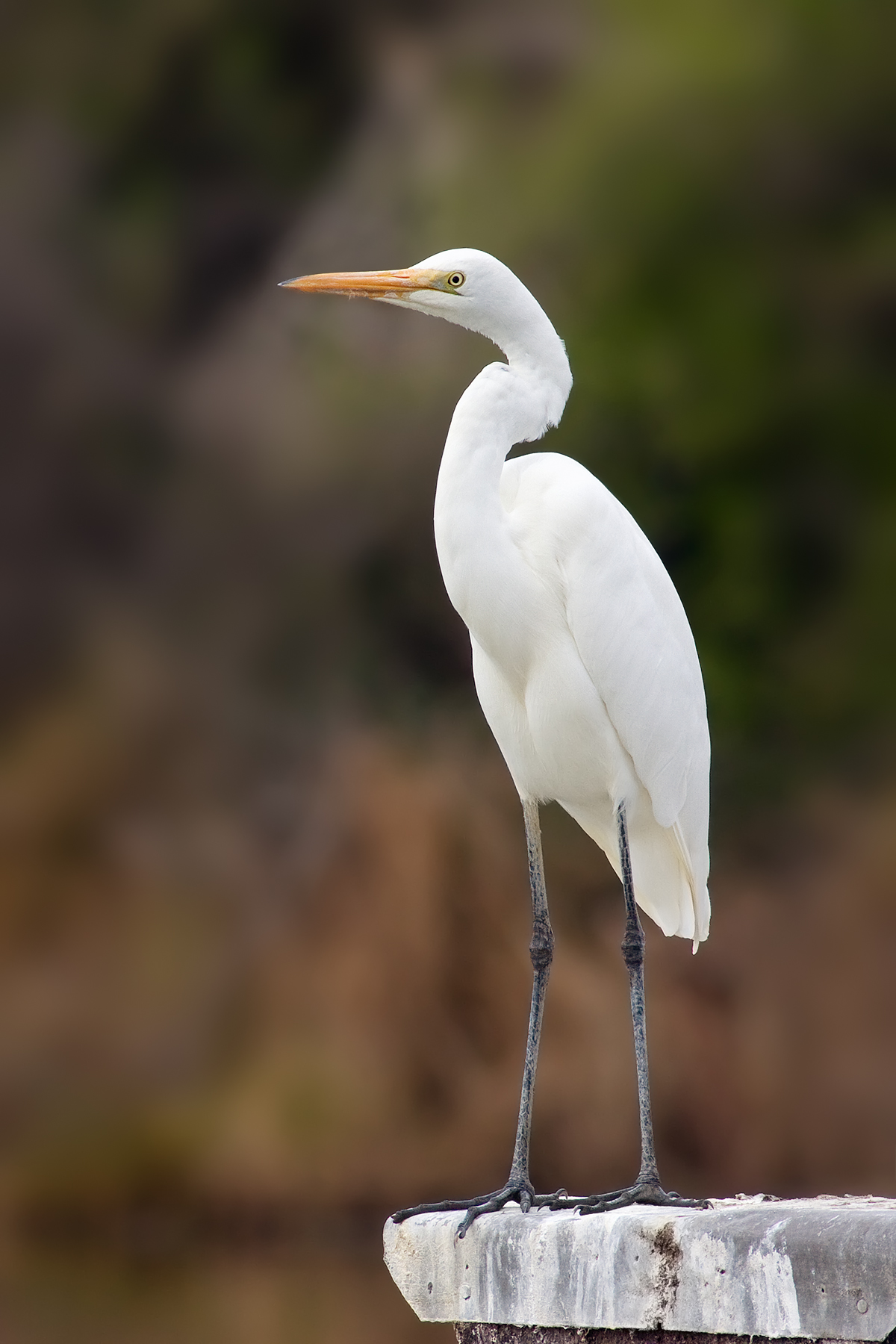
- Non-breeding plumage in Tasmania

Scientific classification
- Kingdom: Animalia
- Phylum: Chordata
- Class: Aves
- Order: Pelecaniformes
- Family: Ardeidae
- Genus: Ardea
- Species: A. alba
- Subspecies: A. a. modesta

Trinomial name
- Ardea alba modesta J.E. Gray, 1831
- Yellow: breeding, green: year-round, blue: non-breeding

Synonyms
- Ardea modesta

= Eastern great egret =

Subspecies of bird

The eastern great egret (Ardea alba modesta) is a species of heron from the genus Ardea, usually considered a subspecies of the great egret (A. alba). In New Zealand it is known as the white heron or by its Māori name kōtuku. It was first described by British ornithologist John Edward Gray in 1831.

== Taxonomy ==
This species was originally described as the "pure white heron of India", Ardea modesta, by Gray in 1831, but was later generally considered a synonym of Ardea alba, by Ellman in 1861 through to the Peters checklist in 1979. It was elevated to species status again by Sibley and Monroe in 1990, and this was supported by a 2005 revision of the herons. It is still sometimes considered a subspecies of the great egret Ardea alba.

== Description ==
Measuring 83–103 centimetres (33–41 in) in length and weighing 0.7–1.2 kilograms (1 lb 9 oz – 2 lb 10 oz), the eastern great egret is a large heron with all-white plumage. Its bill is black in the breeding season and yellow at other times, and its long legs are red or black. The colours of the bare parts of the face change to green during the breeding season. The breeding plumage is also marked by long neck plumes and a green facial area. The eastern great egret can be distinguished from other white egrets and herons in Asia and Australia by its very long neck, one and a half times as long as its own body.

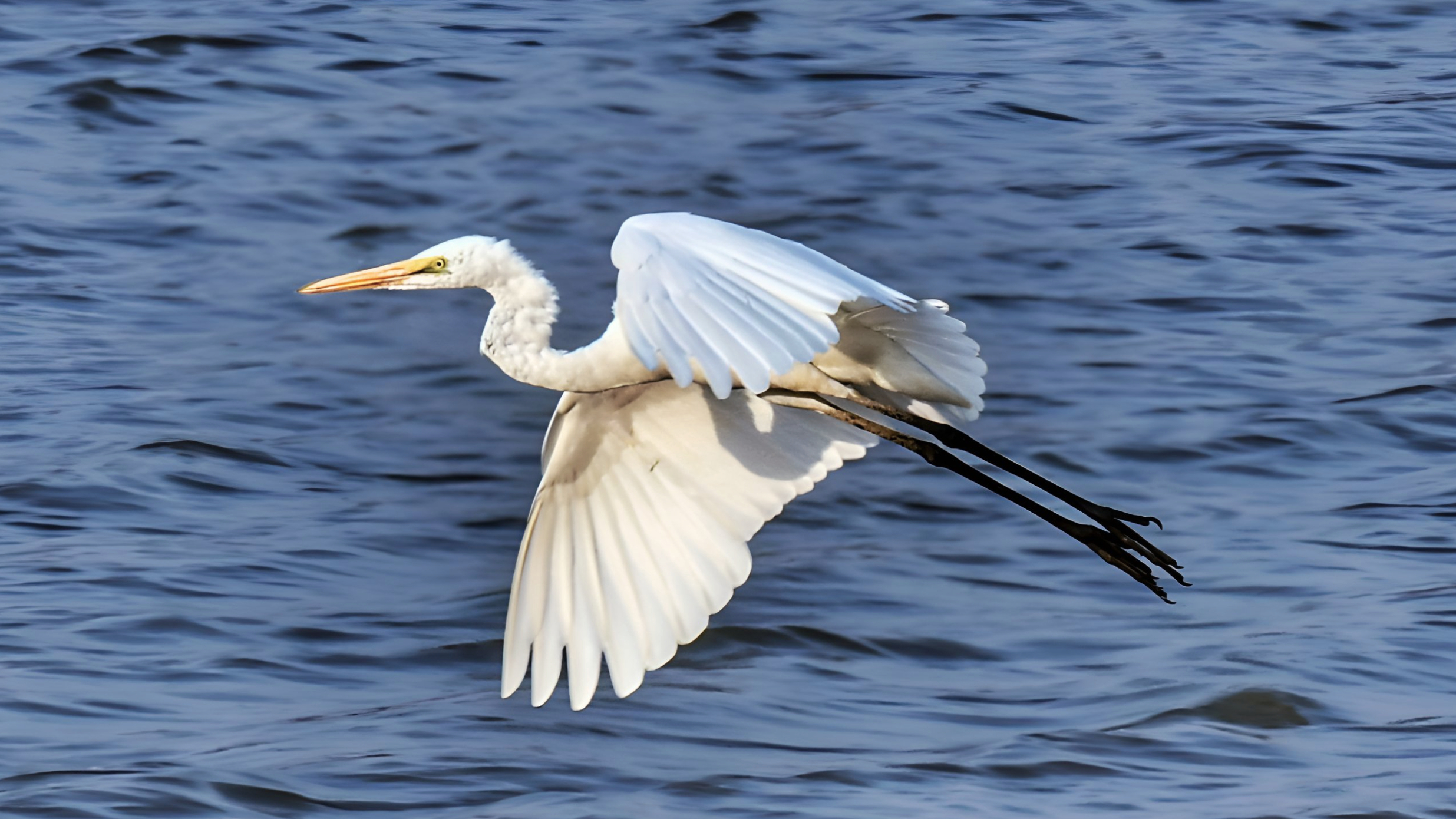
Eastern great egret, non-breeding plumage

== Distribution and habitat ==
The eastern great egret has a wide distribution throughout Asia and Oceania, with breeding populations in Australia, Bangladesh, China, Nepal, India, Indochina, Indonesia, Japan, Korea, Myanmar, New Zealand (in the Waitangiroto Nature Reserve), Pakistan, Papua New Guinea, Philippines (Zamboanga), Russia (north-eastern), Solomon Islands, Sri Lanka, Thailand and Taiwan.

The egret breeds across Australia but only rarely in the southwest of the continent or dry interior. The largest colonies within Australia are in the Top End and Channel Country, which can number several thousand pairs. Colonies in the southeast of Australia can number several hundred pairs. The bird is an uncommon autumn and winter visitor to Tasmania.

== Behaviour ==
=== Feeding ===
The diet includes vertebrates such as fish, frogs, small reptiles, small birds and rodents, and invertebrates such as insects, crustaceans, and molluscs. The eastern great egret hunts by wading or standing still in shallow water and "spearing" prey with its bill.

=== Breeding ===
The eastern great egret often breeds in colonies with other herons, egrets, cormorants, spoonbills and ibises. One brood is raised a year, although the breeding season varies within Australia. In the north of the country it is in March to May, in southern and central Queensland December and January, and October to December in the south. Located atop trees at a height of 20 metres (66 ft) or more, the nest is a flat wide platform of dry branches and sticks with a shallow basin for eggs and young. The clutch consists of anywhere from two to six pale blue-green eggs, with three or four being the usual number. They are oval in shape and measure 52 by 36 millimetres (2 in × 1 3/8 in).

== Status ==
The subspecies is protected in Australia under the National Parks and Wildlife Act 1974. In New Zealand the white heron is highly endangered, with only one breeding site at Waitangiroto Nature Reserve in Whataroa. In 2023, there were 56 pairs of kōtuku nesting in the reserve, an increase compared with recent years. The increase was attributed mainly to the effects of predator control around the reserve. The kōtuku shares this site with the kōtuku ngutupapa, or Royal spoonbill. When Queen Elizabeth II visited New Zealand in 1953 to 1954, she was compared to the kōtuku—a compliment to rare, distinguished visitors. The egret is featured on the reverse side of a New Zealand $2 coin.

== Gallery ==
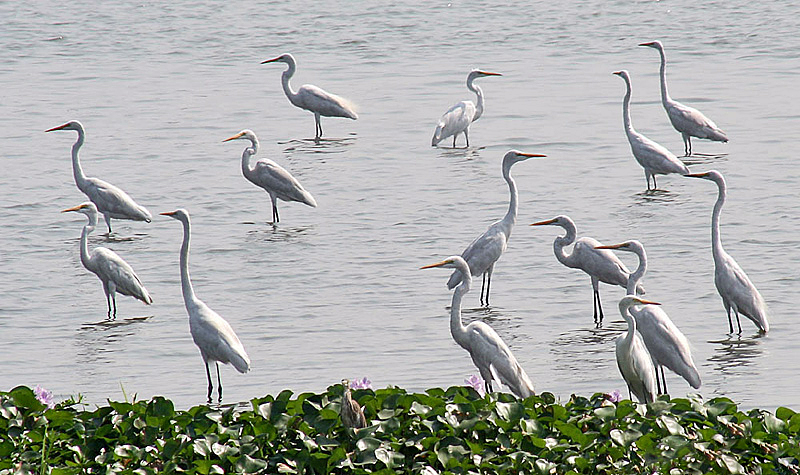
Flock at Kolkata, West Bengal, India

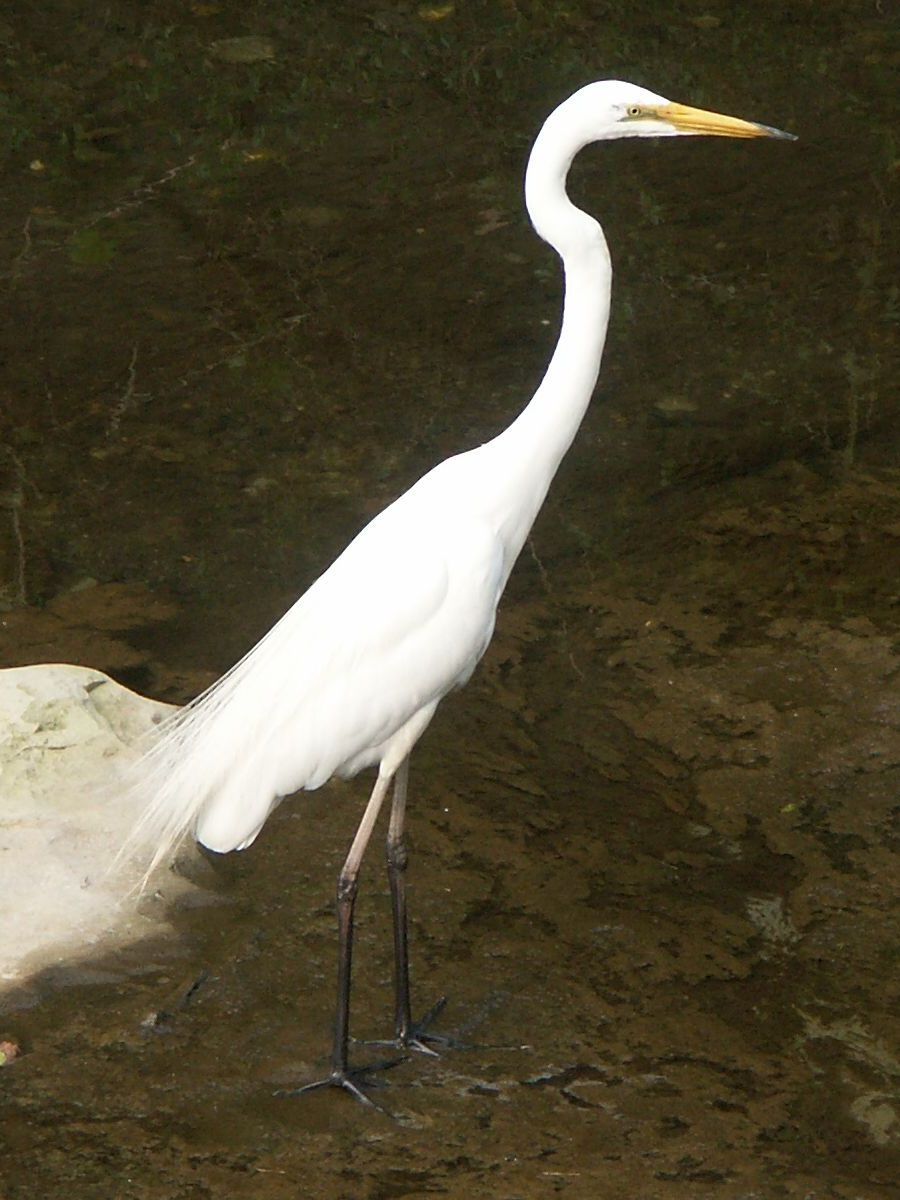
Non-breeding plumage in Japan

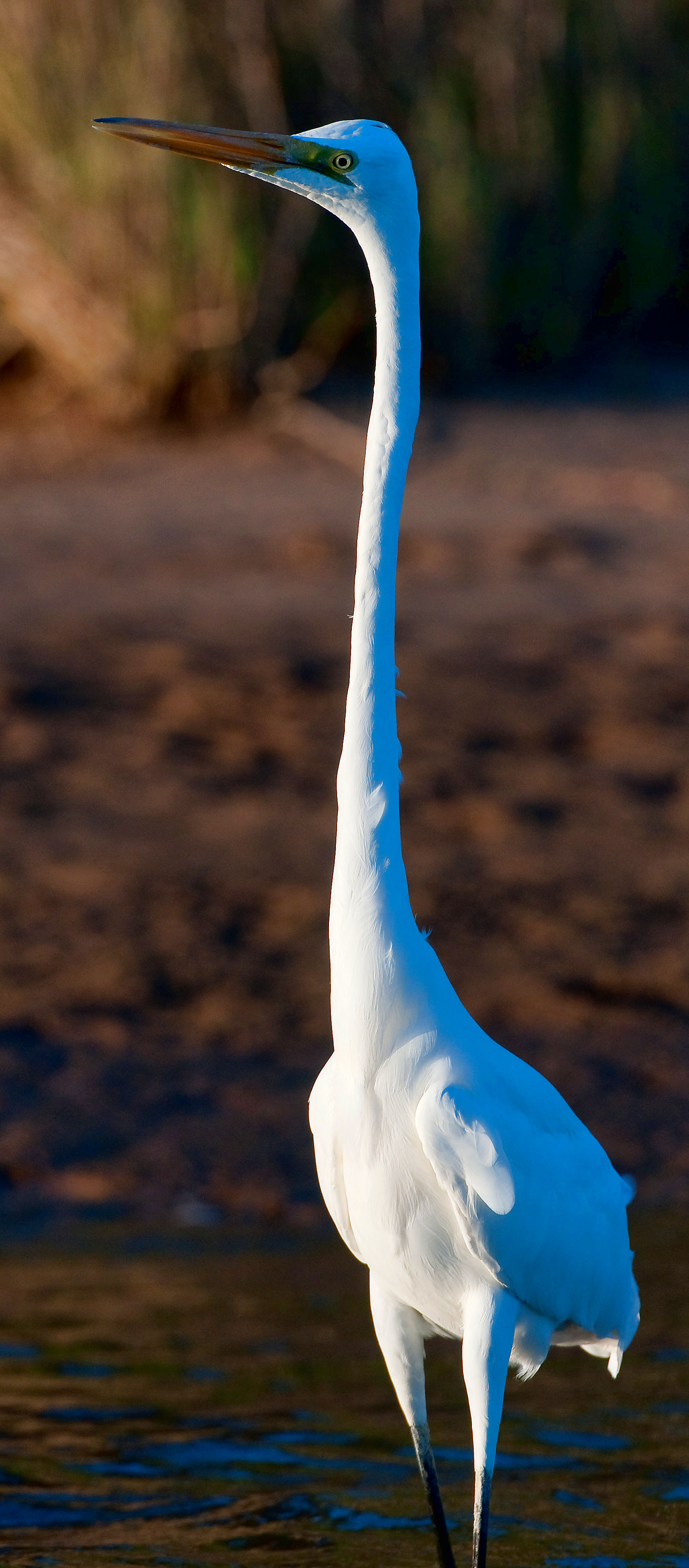
Extended neck of an egret

Eastern great egret in Japan

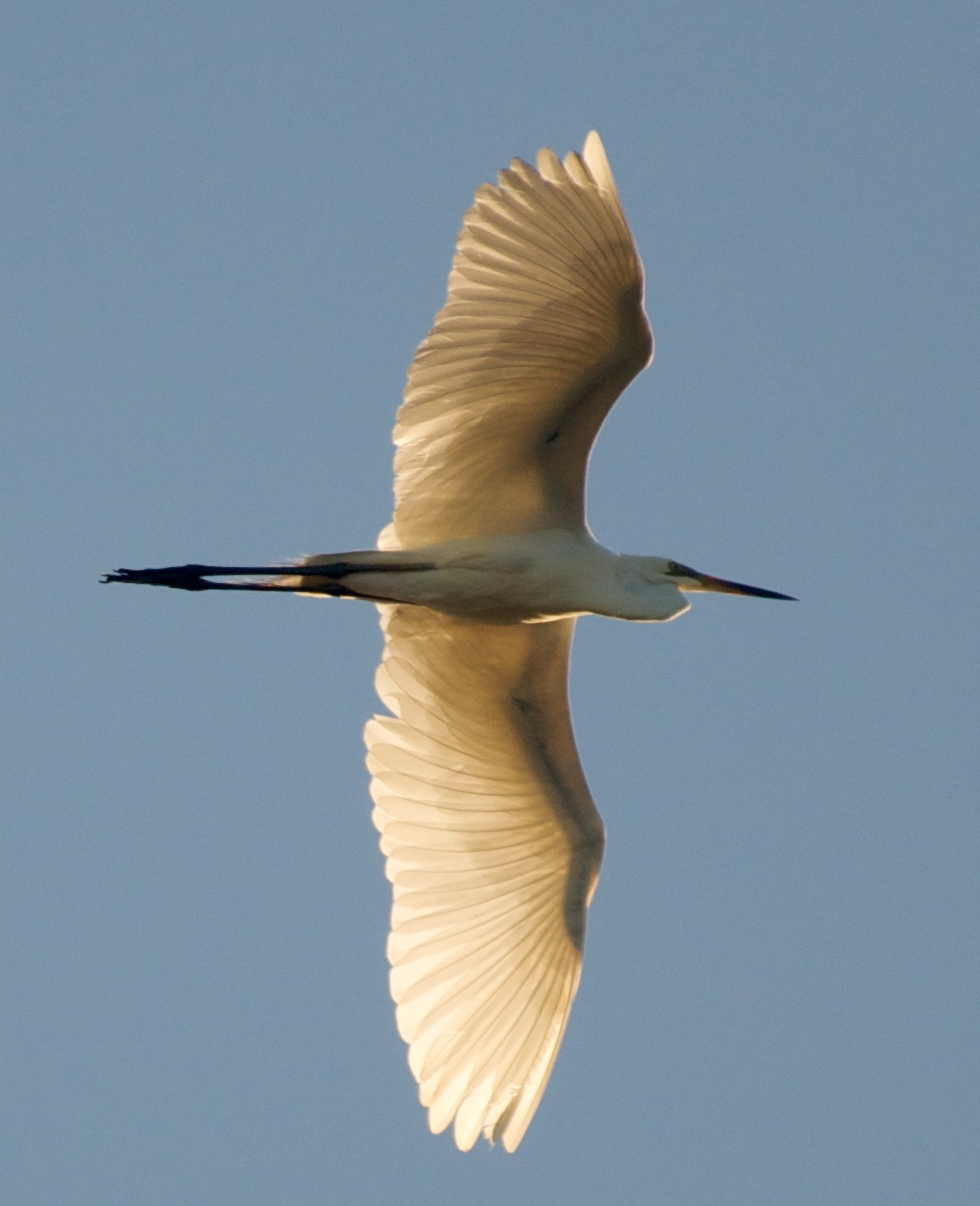
In flight at Lake Monger, Perth, Western Australia

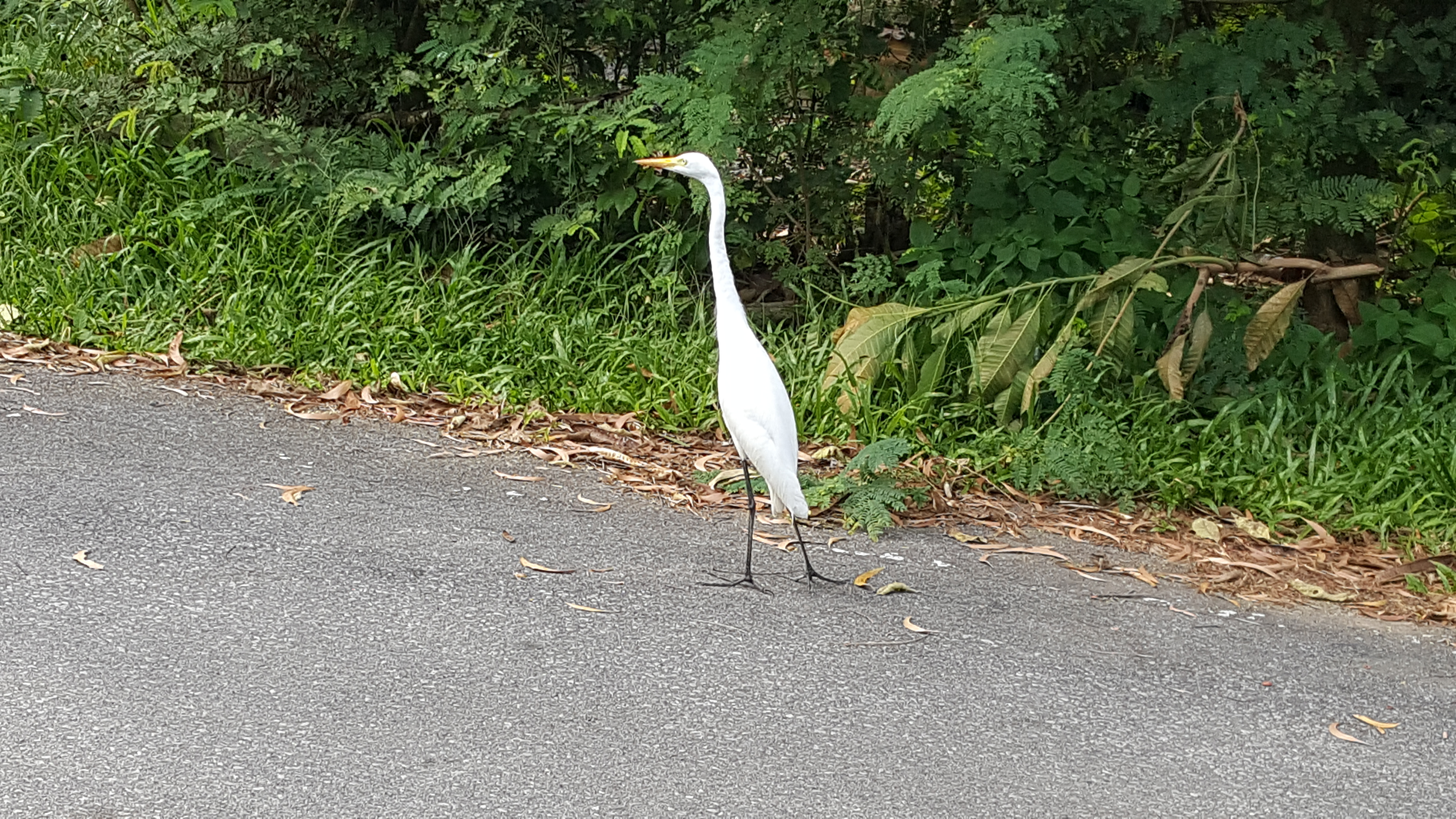
Non-breeding plumage in Thailand

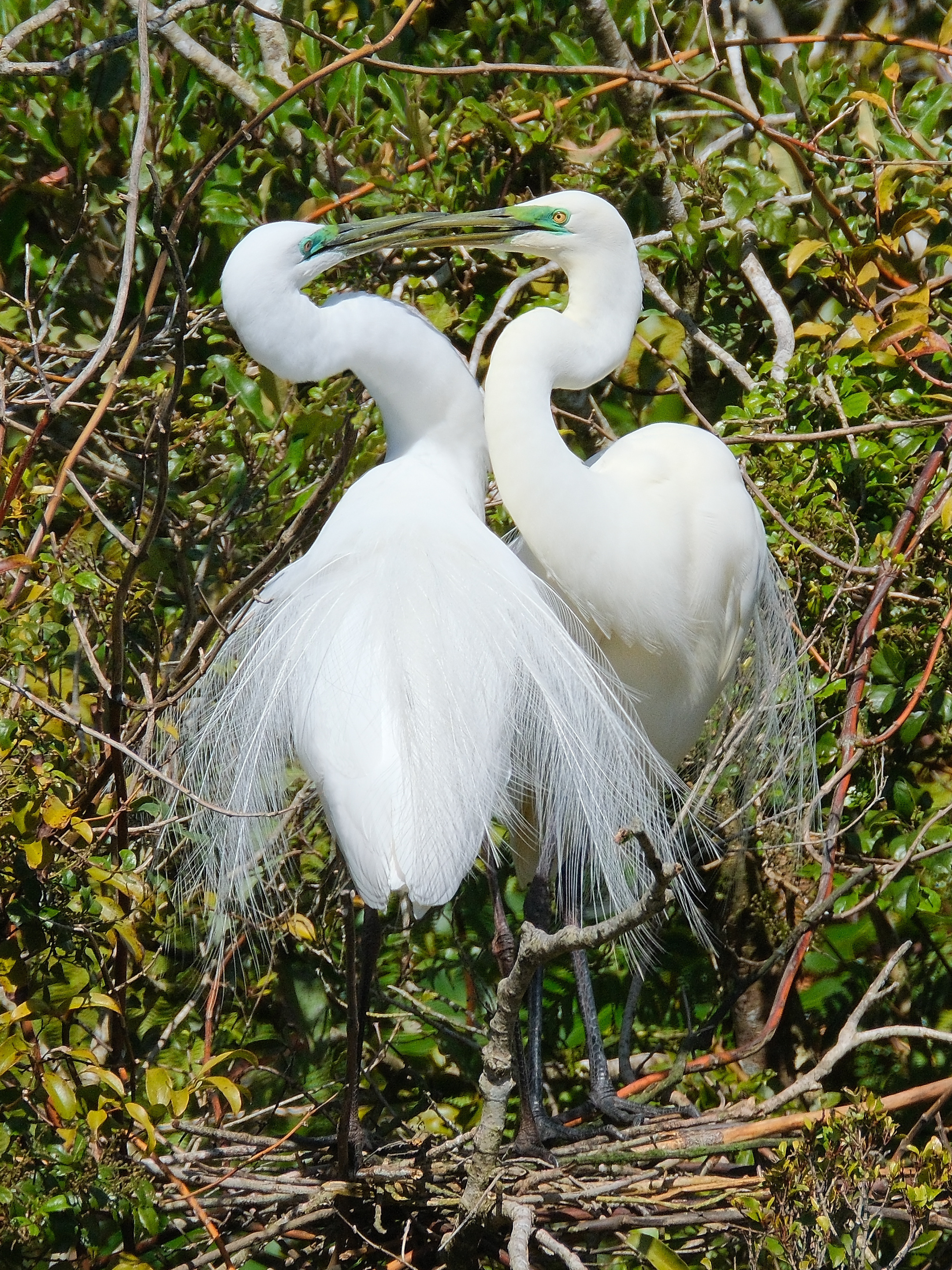
Breeding pair near Ōkārito, New Zealand

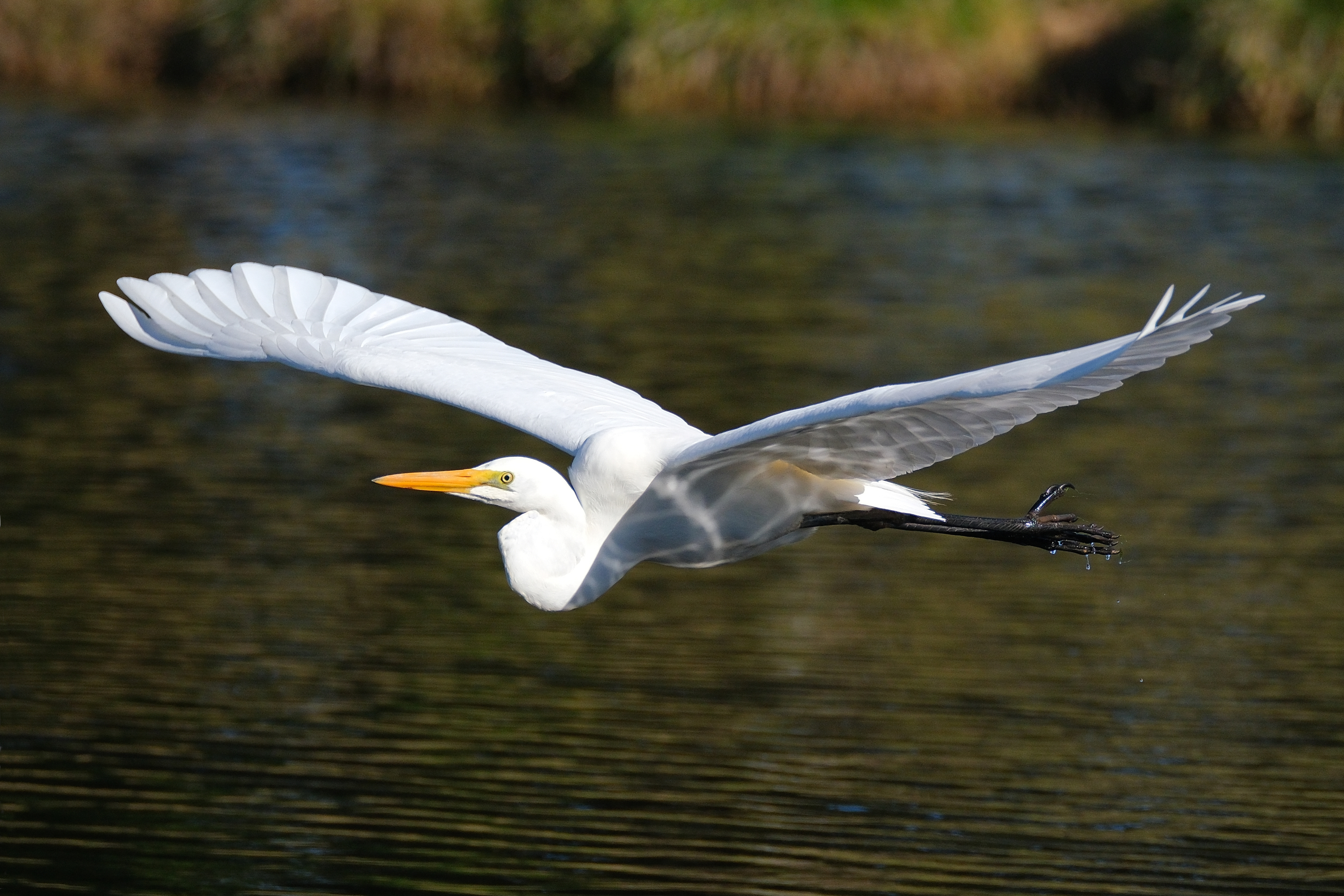
At Waikanae lagoon, New Zealand
