= C7H10O3 =

The molecular formula C_{7}H_{10}O_{3} (molar mass: 142.15 g/mol) may refer to:

- Diallyl carbonate
- Glycidyl methacrylate
- Triacetylmethane
- 2,4,6-Heptanetrione
