= Pakihi =

New Zealand wetland vegetation biotope

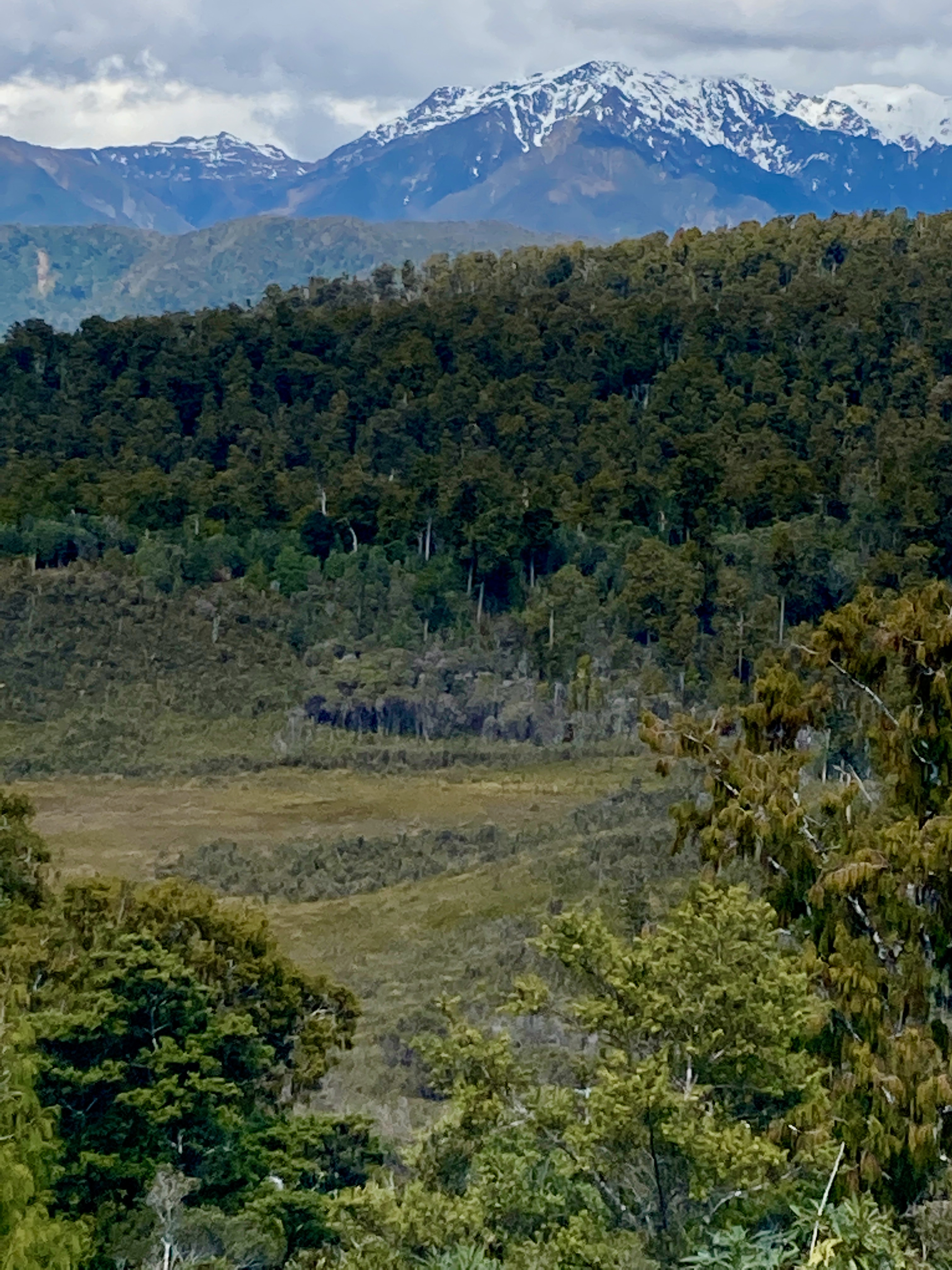
Pakihi wetland surrounded by forest, Ōkārito, New Zealand

Pakihi or pākihi is a vegetation association unique to the West Coast of the South Island of New Zealand, characterised by flat boggy land with infertile, waterlogged soil on which only rushes, ferns, moss, and mānuka grow.

== Name ==
The Māori word pākihi can mean "open country" or "barren land", or alternatively "a clearing in forest" or "place where fern root was dug up". Both these ideas are encompassed by the use of pakihi in New Zealand English to refer to open country, mainly on the West Coast of the South Island, from which forest was once cleared but which no longer allows tree growth.

== Extent ==
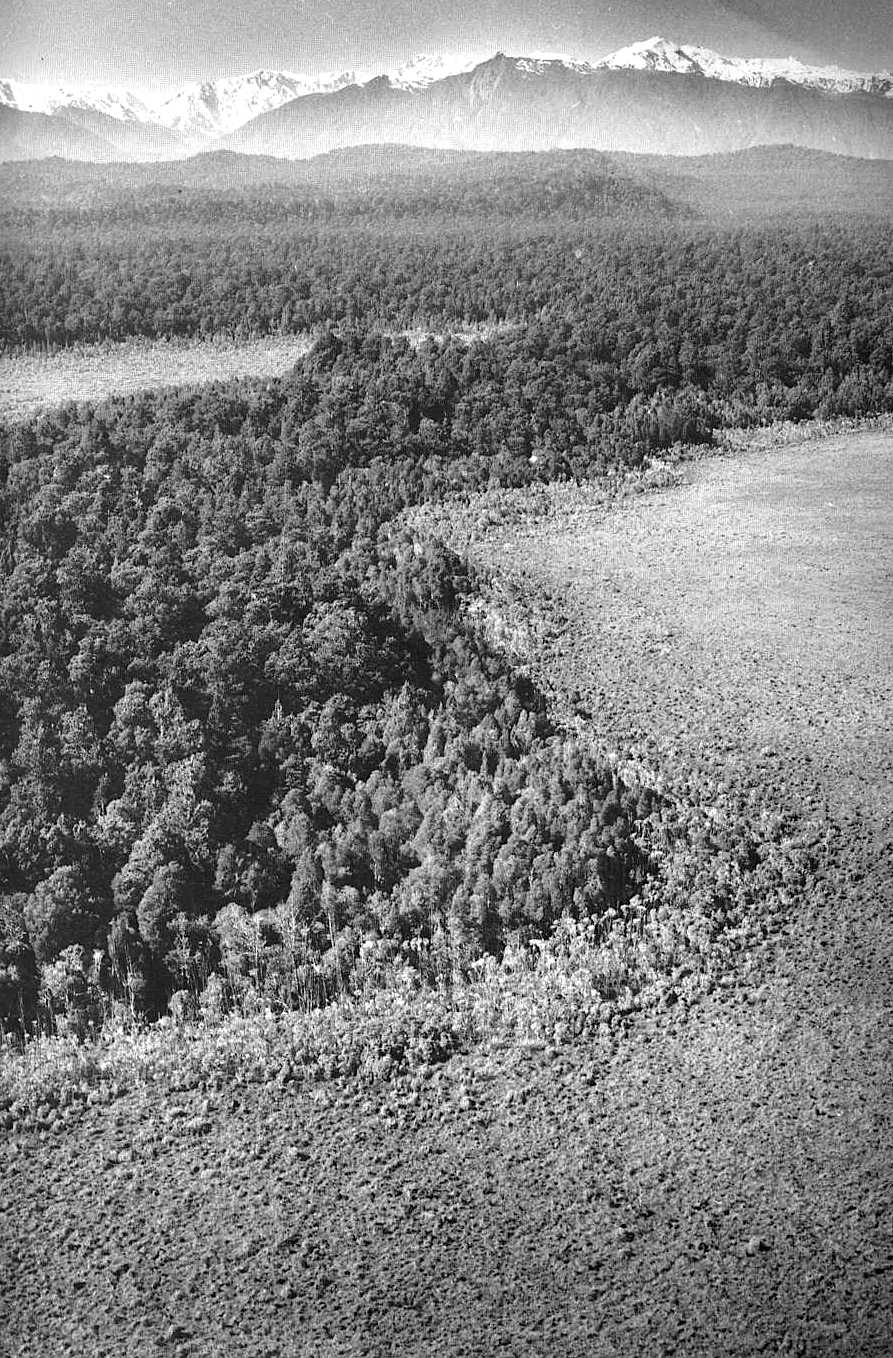
Aerial view of the transition from pakihi through silver pine (Manoao colensoi) to rimu (Dacrydium cupressinum) forest on better drained terrain

Pakihi habitat ranges over 540 km (340 mi) of the west of the South Island, from Golden Bay in the north to Awarua Bay in the south, being particularly common in the central West Coast between Westport and Hokitika, usually near the coast but sometimes extending some 50 km (30 mi) inland. Pakihi can be both natural or induced. Some pakihi has existed for thousands of years, even back to glacial times—for example, the Dismal or Sponge Swamp near Haast studied in the 1960s–1970s, where the base peat layer dates back 10,000 years. The anoxic pakihi soil can halt the decomposition of fossil pollen and fragments of wood, allowing the study of ancient forest types on the site.

Conversely, land cleared of forest by early European settlers on the West Coast can become waterlogged and infertile, and regular fires can prevent forest returning and maintain pakihi vegetation, particularly in Golden Bay and the northern West Coast. Forest clearance by the first Polynesian settlers and later by Māori also created pakihi sites; Abel Tasman reported seeing fires as he sailed off the West Coast. Most pakihi seems to have been created by fire, but they are hard to distinguish from those that predate human arrival.

== Soil ==
Pakihi sites are almost always flat to undulating in topography, rarely sloping. They mostly occur on outwash plains and terraces formed of sediment left behind by retreating ice, usually at the end of the last glacial period: these terraces can be 10,000 to 250,000 years old. Pakihi soils, usually gleys or podzols, are infertile and leached of most nutrients by constant water flow. They are acidic, with a pH of less than 4.5. They are also extremely waterlogged, usually only found where rainfall is greater than 2,200 mm (87 in) a year. One way pakihi can arise is through the formation of an iron pan in the subsoil, which prevents free drainage and "drowns" forest trees, until only ferns, moss, and scrub can survive. Iron pans are not required for pahiki soils to form, but poor drainage is: any soil characteristics that keep the ground waterlogged can maintain pakihi.

== Vegetation ==
Pakihi has a characteristic suite of plant species, usually including:

- Mānuka (Leptospermum scoparium)
- Inanga (Dracophyllum longifolium)
- Upright cutty grass (Gahnia rigida)
- Tangle ferns (Gleichenia dicarpa, G. microphylla)
- Pakihi rush (Baumea teretifolia)
- Wire rush (Empodisma minus)
- Wīwī (Juncus edgariae, previously considered Juncus gregiflorus)
- Square sedge (Lepidosperma australe)
- Red tussock (Chionochloa rubra)
- Sphagnum moss
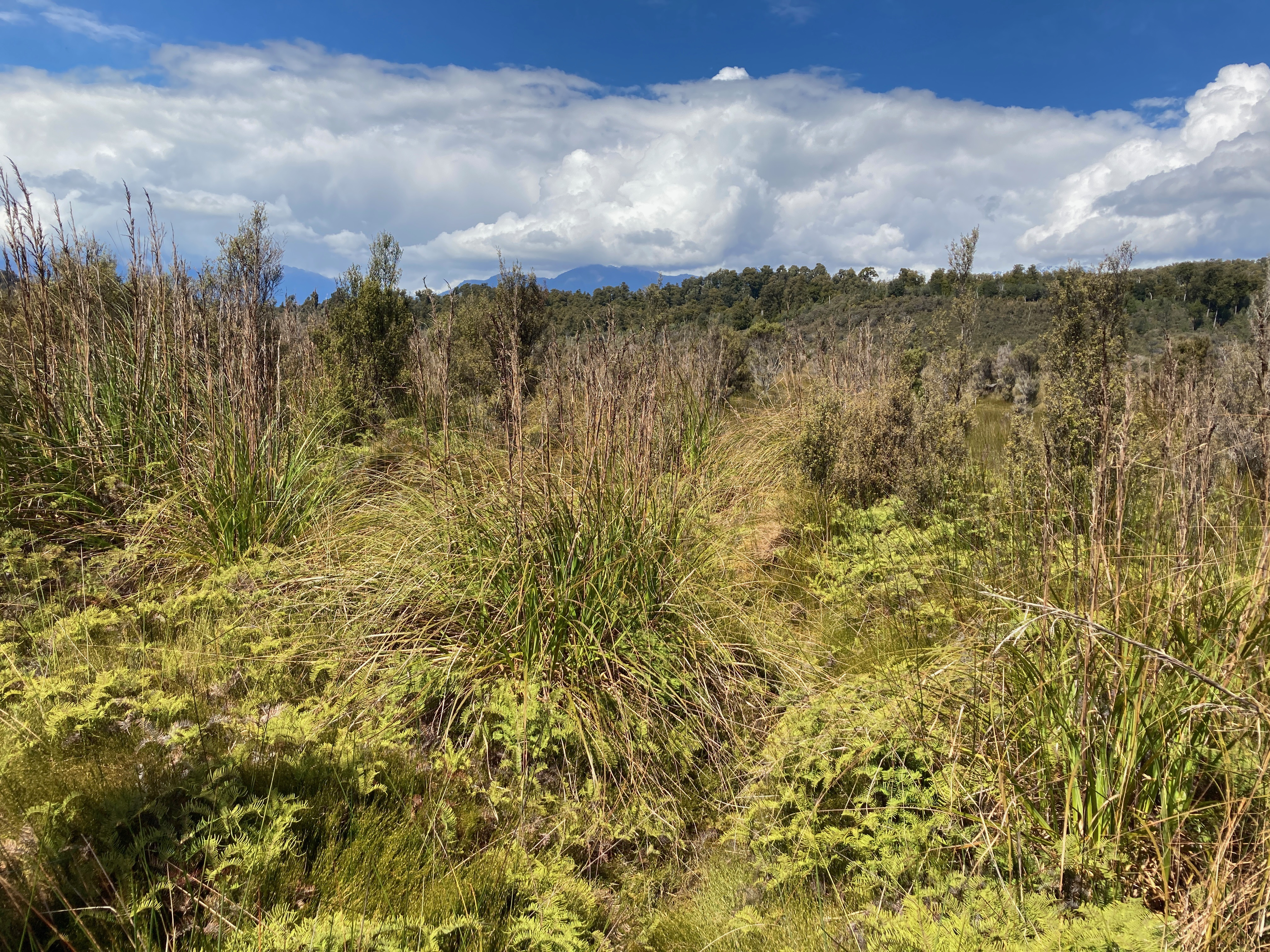
Pakihi near Ōkārito

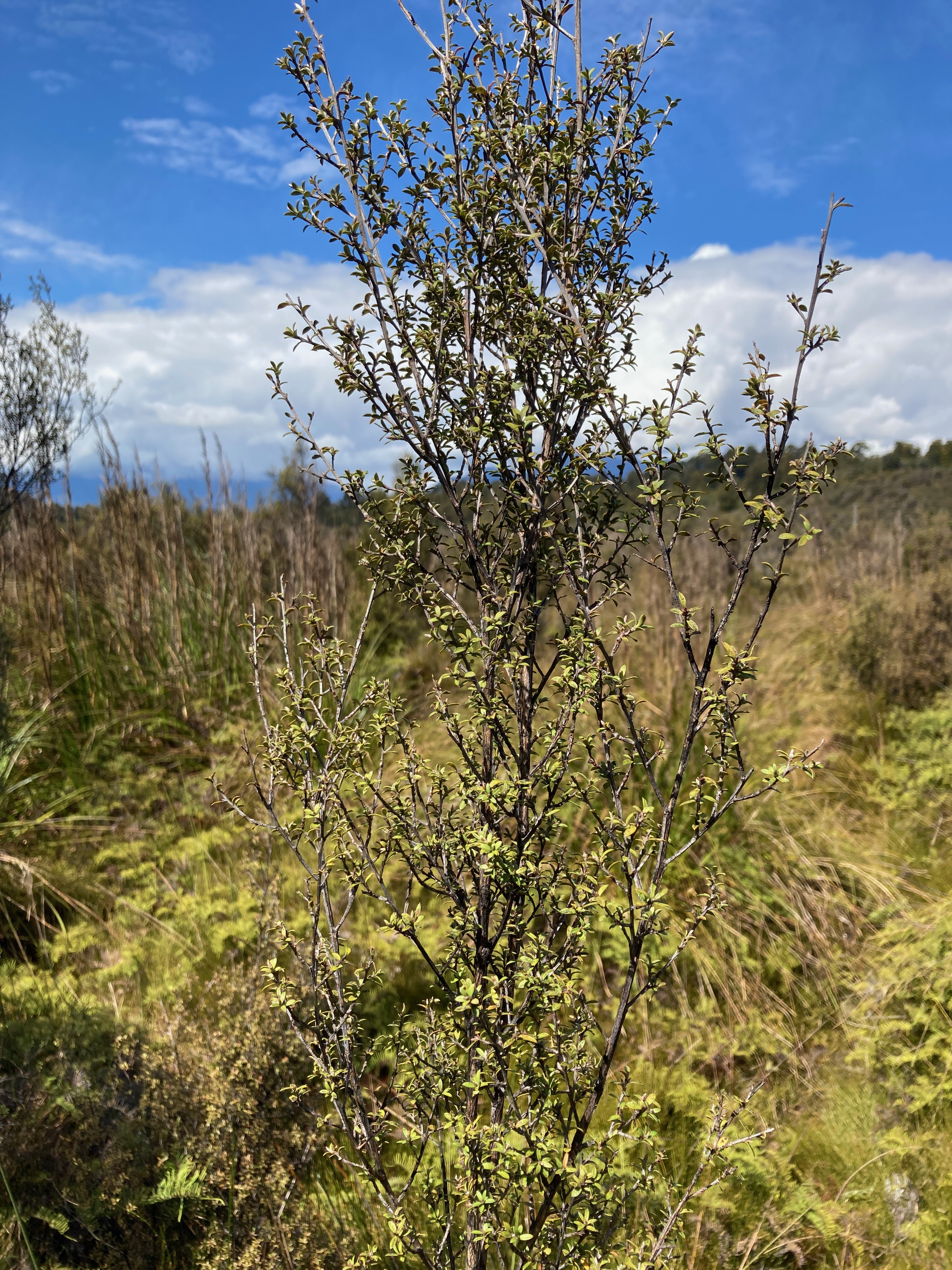
Mānuka

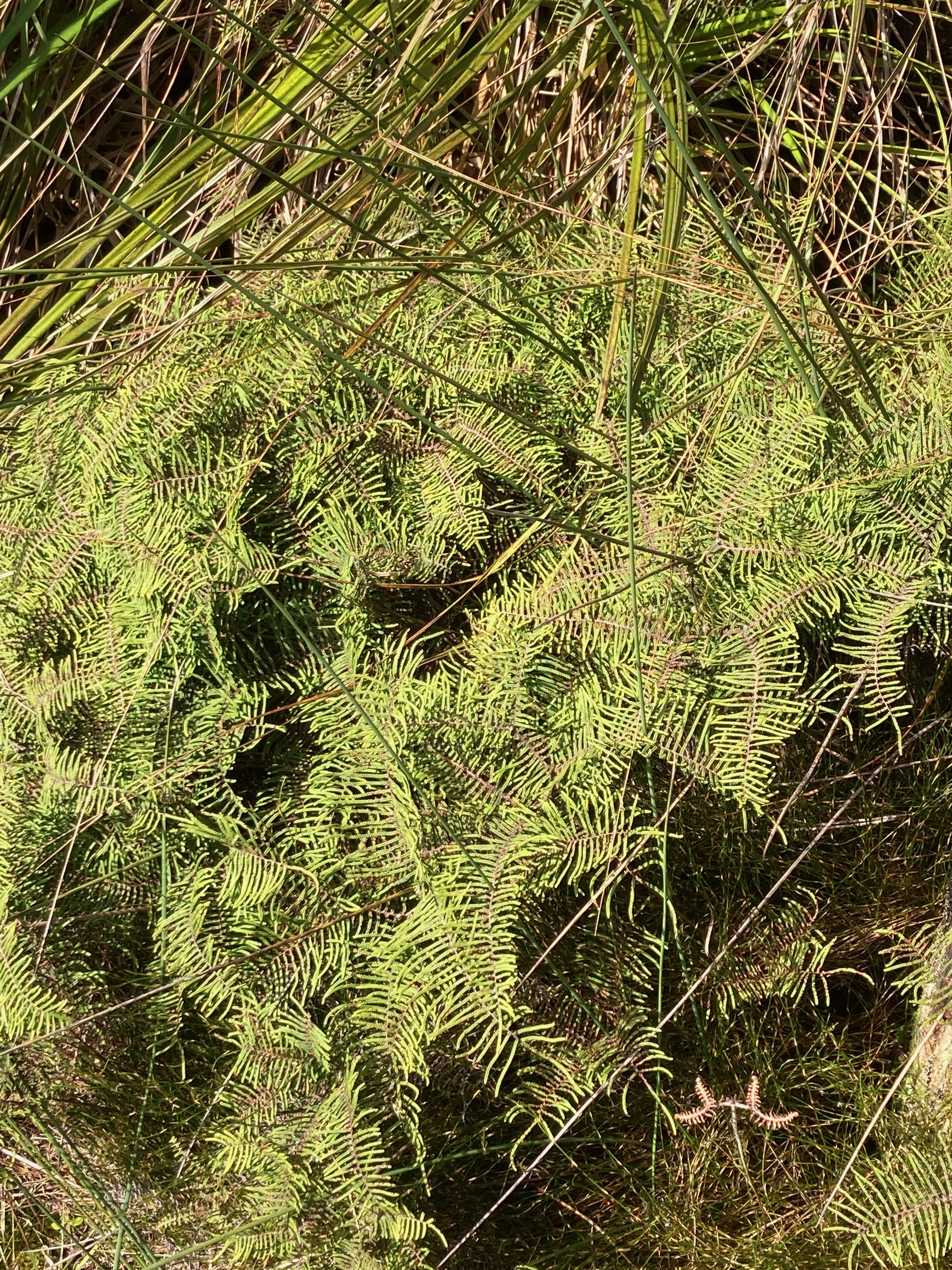
Tangle fern

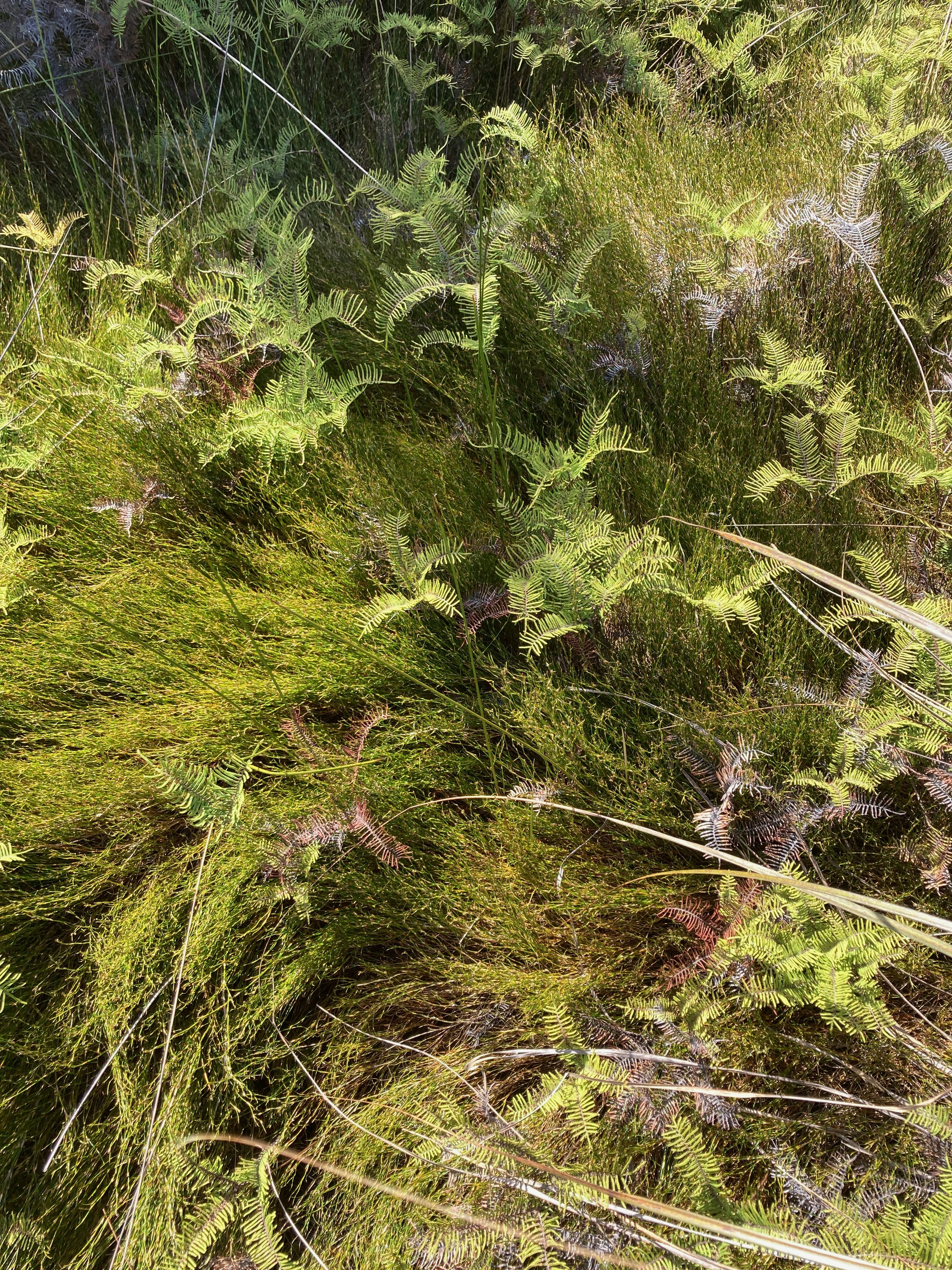
Wire rush

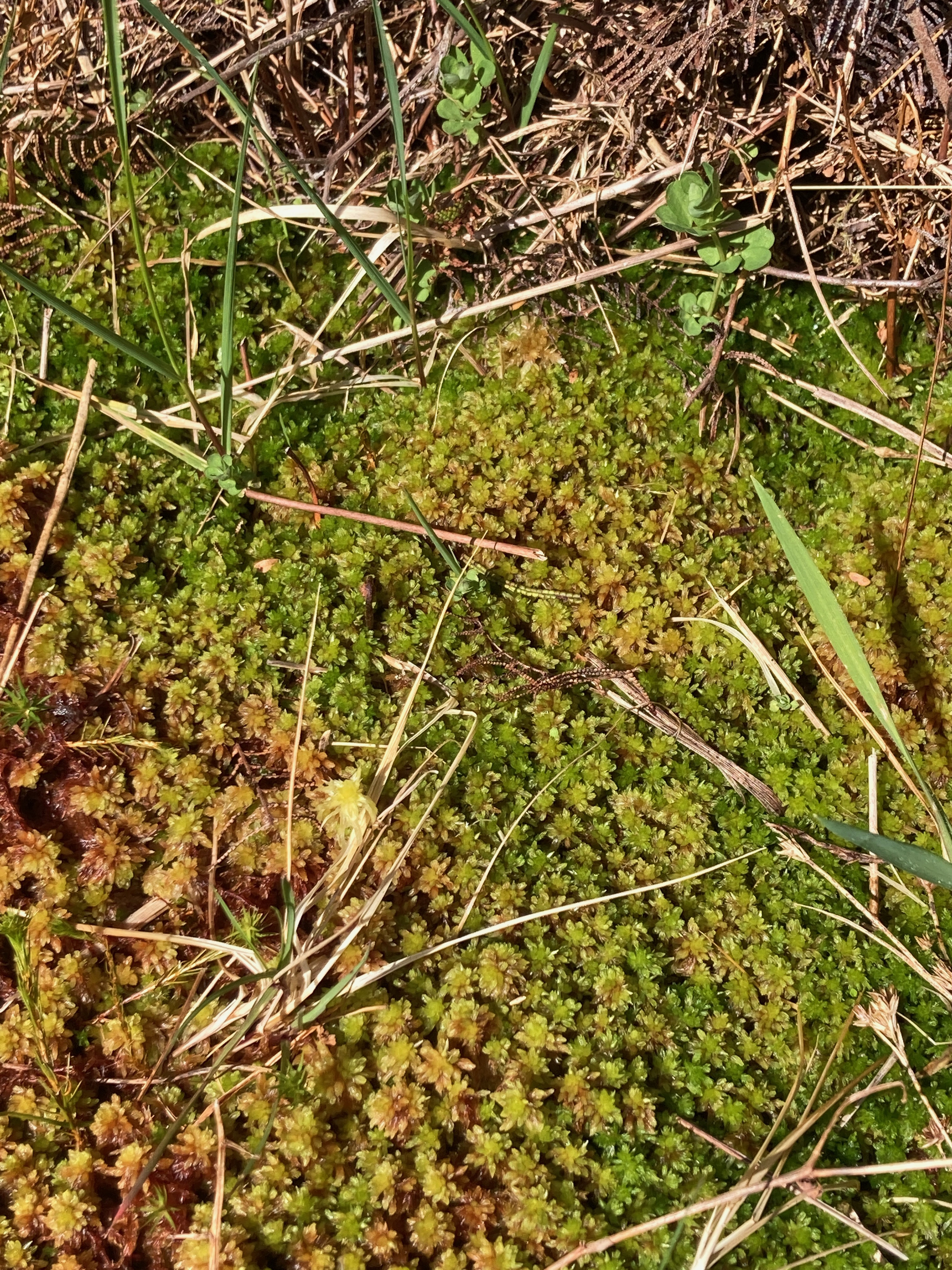
Moss

This mix of species can also include orchids (such as Thelymitra pulchella), bryophytes, sundews (Drosera), introduced Canada rush (Juncus canadensis), tamingi (Epacris pauciflora), and mountain flax (Phormium colensoi). Around the margins of pakihi are found mānuka, mountain toatoa (Phyllocladus alpinus) and silver pine (Manoao colensoi), which grade into rimu (Dacrydium cupressinum) and kahikatea (Dacrycarpus dacrydioides) swamp forest. The key determinants of a pakihi area's vegetation are how long since it has been burnt, climate, and age of the glacial terrace. Many pakihi are dynamic ecosystems undergoing a transition to mānuka scruband, and all but the wettest areas will eventually revert to forest.

== Cultivation ==
When the West Coast was settled by Europeans, pakihi seemed like ideal farmland, with no forest to clear: it merely required draining and sowing with grass seed. This was easier said than done in flat areas with high rainfall, and much pakihi was abandoned as too difficult to farm. For many years, farmers tried to turn pakihi into productive land, experimenting with sowing different pasture grasses, liming, adding large amounts of fertiliser, and even using explosives to break up the iron pan. Different techniques were explored by the Cawthron Institute on experimental plots near Westport starting in the 1920s, when 1,100 acres were "reclaimed" and turned into dairy pasture in the 1930s, largely unsuccessfully. Today pakihi can be converted into pasture by "flipping" the top two or three metres with a digger to break up any soil pan and allow free drainage, or by "humping and hollowing": both require heavy application of fertiliser such as superphosphate for years to increase soil carbon and nitrogen. One side effect of such large scale land conversion is pest outbreaks, as the "blank slate" created allows insects to multiply rapidly, free of natural enemies. After "flipping" at Cape Foulwind, mānuka beetle larvae (Pyronota festiva), usually present at a density of 80 per m^{2}, were recorded at over 3500 per m^{2}.

Sphagnum moss is a common component of pakihi, and on the West Coast is now being harvested and exported for horticulture and growing indoor plants.

== Conservation ==
A major threat to pakihi is agriculture, especially with the New Zealand economy increasingly turning to dairy farming. As the technology for developing pakihi land for farming or forestry became more efficient in the 1970s, calls for its conservation began. Pakihi swampland is an important habitat for the fernbird, especially where there is mānuka scrub at least 2 m (6.6 ft) tall, and some pakihi areas have been set aside as reserves. Pakihi reserves may need to be regularly burnt off to allow low herbaceous plants to survive and prevent mānuka scrubland establishing, but fernbirds prefer low shrubby vegetation that would be destroyed by fire.
