= Manuka oil =

Essential oil of New Zealand tea tree

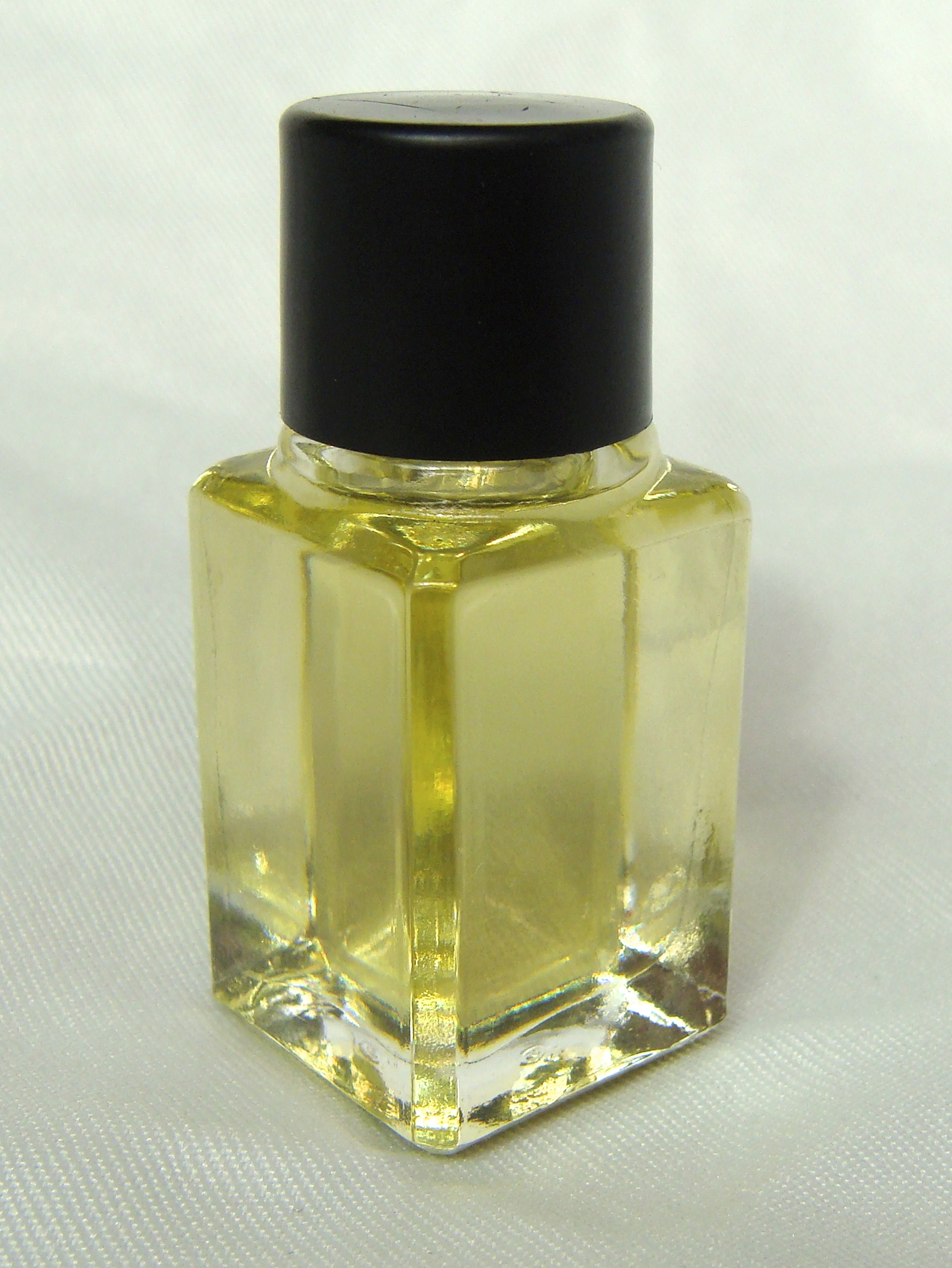
Pure Steam Distilled Manuka (Leptospermum scoparium) Oil

Manuka oil is an essential oil obtained from the steam distillation of the leaves and small branches of the tree Leptospermum scoparium (commonly known as mānuka, or New Zealand tea tree). Though it is used in a wide range of cosmetics, cosmeceuticals and naturopathic and topical medications, manuka oil is a relatively new development; it was first identified during the 1970s and has been produced commercially since the 1980s and investigated by global research teams since then.

== Main constituents ==
The composition of manuka oil is dependent on its chemotype. Manuka oil from the East Cape region of New Zealand, described as a high triketone chemotype, is commercially important because of its antimicrobial properties (the ability to kill bacteria, viruses, yeasts and fungi).

The triketone chemotype of manuka oil from the East Cape contains over 20% triketones (often as high as 33%), comprising flavesone, leptospermone and iso-leptospermone. Manuka that grows in the Marlborough Sounds region of New Zealand also has relative high levels of triketones, between 15 and 20%. In contrast, manuka that grows in Australia have a different essential oil profile that does not include triketones

More than ten other chemotypes of New Zealand manuka that have been described. These oils are rich in terpene compounds, particularly sesquiterpenes, such as myrcene, humulene, caryophyllene, α-pinene, linalool, α-copaene, elemene, selinene, calamenene, cubebene and cadinene amongst others.

== Production ==
Until recently, most of New Zealand's manuka oil production came from wild-harvested manuka. Harvesters used brush cutters to gather fresh branches, leaving the bushes viable for regrowth available for future years. In recent years manuka plantations in the East Cape region of New Zealand are allowing for the mechanical harvesting of manuka leaf to produce essential oil at a commercial scale. The oil is distilled from the leaves and small branches of the manuka bush using the technique of steam distillation where the steam is passed through the leaf material. The steam is then condensed and the oil floats on top of the condensed water from where it is drawn off. Distillation processes vary from the super- heated fast extraction method to the slower ambient pressure distillation at lower temperatures. Each tonne of foliage produces 3–5 litres of manuka essential oil.
