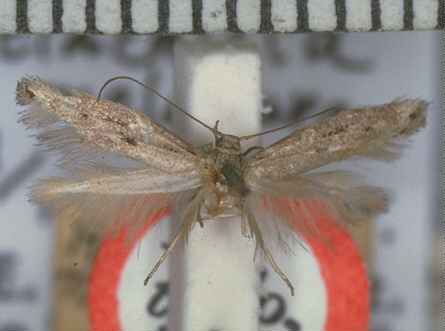
- Holotype specimen

Conservation status
- Data Deficit (NZ TCS)

Scientific classification
- Kingdom: Animalia
- Phylum: Arthropoda
- Clade: Pancrustacea
- Class: Insecta
- Order: Lepidoptera
- Family: Elachistidae
- Genus: Elachista
- Species: E. melanura

Binomial name
- Elachista melanura Meyrick, 1889

= Elachista melanura =

Species of moth endemic to New Zealand

Elachista melanura is a species of moth in the family Elachistidae. This species is endemic to New Zealand. It is classified as "Data Deficient" by the Department of Conservation.

== Taxonomy ==
This species was originally described by Edward Meyrick in 1889 using a female specimen collected in Hamilton in January. Hudson discussed this species in his 1928 publication The Moths and Butterflies of New Zealand. The holotype is held at the Natural History Museum, London.

== Description ==
Meyrick described the species as follows:

♂. 13mm. Head, palpi, antennæ, and thorax whitish-grey. Abdomen ochreous-whitish, with a dense black apical exsertible tuft. Legs dark fuscous, posterior pair ochreous-whitish. Forewings lanceolate; whitish-grey, somewhat irrorated with darker; an elongate black dot on fold before middle, a second in disc above middle, and a third in disc at ⅔: cilia grey-whitish, with a spot of black scales at base round apex, and tips sprinkled with black. Hindwings and cilia pale whitish-grey.

== Distribution ==
This species is endemic to New Zealand. Other than its type locality, this species has also been collected in Titirangi in February 2000.

== Habitat ==
The type specimen was collected in heath-like scrub and swamp habitat. It has also been collected in gumland and pakihi (a type of wetland).

== Conservation status ==
This species has been classified as having the "Data Deficient" conservation status under the New Zealand Threat Classification System.
