= Maikaika =

Maikaika is a common name for any of several New Zealand plants with edible underground parts:

- Arthropodium cirratum, also called rengarenga lily
- Orthoceras strictum, also called horned orchid
- Thelymitra pulchella, another orchid, commonly called the striped sun orchid
