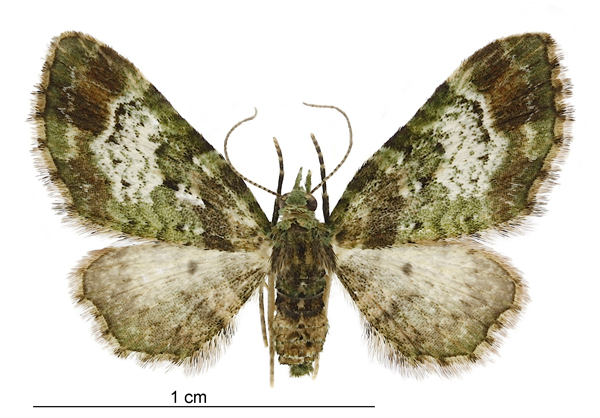
- Female
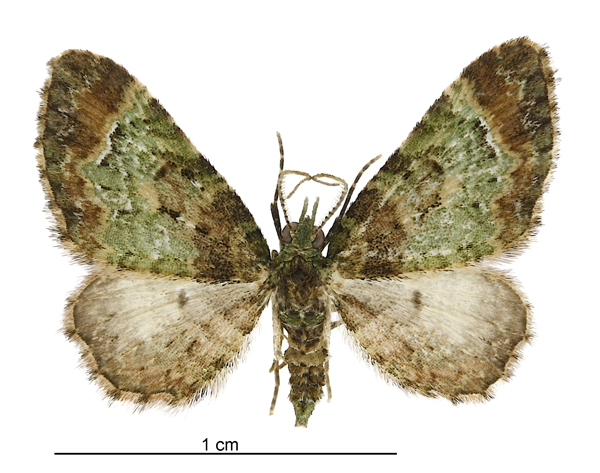
- Male

Scientific classification
- Kingdom: Animalia
- Phylum: Arthropoda
- Class: Insecta
- Order: Lepidoptera
- Family: Geometridae
- Genus: Pasiphila
- Species: P. sandycias

Binomial name
- Pasiphila sandycias (Meyrick, 1905)

Synonyms
- Chloroclystis sandycias Meyrick, 1905; Chloroclystis plinthîna (Meyrick, 1888)

= Pasiphila sandycias =

Species of moth endemic to New Zealand

Pasiphila sandycias is a moth in the family Geometridae. It was first described by Edward Meyrick in 1905. This species is endemic to New Zealand and is found in the southern half of the North Island, throughout the South Island and on Stewart Island. It inhabits native scrub populated with its larval host plants, Coprosma areolata and Coprosma rotundifolia. The larvae feed on the blossoms of its hosts and this life stage is synchronised with the flowering of those plants. The larvae are well camouflaged as they appear similar to a roughened Comprosma twig. The pupa is enclosed in a cocoon made of silk and refuse and can be found amongst shoots of its host plants. Adult moths have been observed on the wing from August to February. They are nocturnal, attracted to light and have been shown to pollinate Leptospermum scoparium and Olearia virgata.

== Taxonomy ==
George Hudson in his 1898 book New Zealand moths and butterflies (Macro-lepidoptera) illustrated and discussed this species mistaking it for what is now known as Pasiphila plinthina. Edward Meyrick, recognising that the species was new, first described it in 1905 and originally named it Chloroclystis sandycias. In 1928 Hudson followed Meyrick and discussed and illustrated this species under the name C. sandycias. In 1971 John S. Dugdale placed this species in the genus Pasiphila. The male lectotype, collected in Wellington by Hudson, is held at the Natural History Museum, London.

== Description ==
Hudson described the larva of this species as follows:

Its length when full-grown is about 3/8 inch; the head is very small, pale ochreous; the body very stout tapering towards the head, dull greyish-green, or rich purple, many intermediate forms occurring; there is a conspicuous, elongate, triangular, blackish mark behind the head extending to the fifth segment; V-shaped marks are situated on segments 6, 7 and 8, which are humped; the remaining segments are paler with faint irregular lines on the sides; there are numerous minute ring-shaped makings over the entire insect.

The larvae of this species is very variable in appearance. They are well camouflaged as they appear similar to a roughened Comprosma shoot.

Meyrick described the adults of this species as follows:

♂♀. 14-16 mm. Head and palpi ochreous-white, seldom mixed with green, palpi 2 2/3. Antennz white ringed with dark grey, in ♂ ciliated with fascicles (3). Thorax whitish-ochreous sprinkled with blackish. Abdomen ochreous-whitish, more or less tinged with reddish-ochreous towards base and apex, and variably sprinkled or mixed with blackish. Fore-wings somewhat elongate-triangular, costa faintly sinuate, apex obtuse, termen bowed, rather oblique; ochreous-whitish to white; basal area more or less tinged with reddish-ochreous and suffusedly striated with blackish irroration, usually extending considerably further on costal area than on dorsal; median band almost always conspicuously pale, sometimes mixed with green, generally striated with dark irroration on costa and dorsum but seldom indistinctly throughout, posterior edge formed by a double pale line prominently angulated in middle, more than usually approximated to termen on lower half; when a series of blackish neural dots precedes this, it follows the angulation of the line; a blackish linear discal dot, sometimes indistinct; terminal area reddish-brown, seldom mixed with green, interrupted by a pale patch opposite angle of median band, subterminal line pale, waved; an interrupted blackish terminal line: cilia whitish more or less suffused with fuscous-reddish, basal half barred with blackish, apical half less distinctly with grey. Hind-wings with termen sinuate, rounded-prominent below middle; whitish, towards dorsum obscurely striated with reddish and blackish irroration; a rather large blackish-grey discal dot; terminal area with indistinct grey lines, sometimes reddish-tinged; cilia as in fore-wings.

This species can be recognised by its small size. Although it is similar in appearance to P. plinthina it can be distinguished from that species as a result of its much shorter palpi and darker colouration.

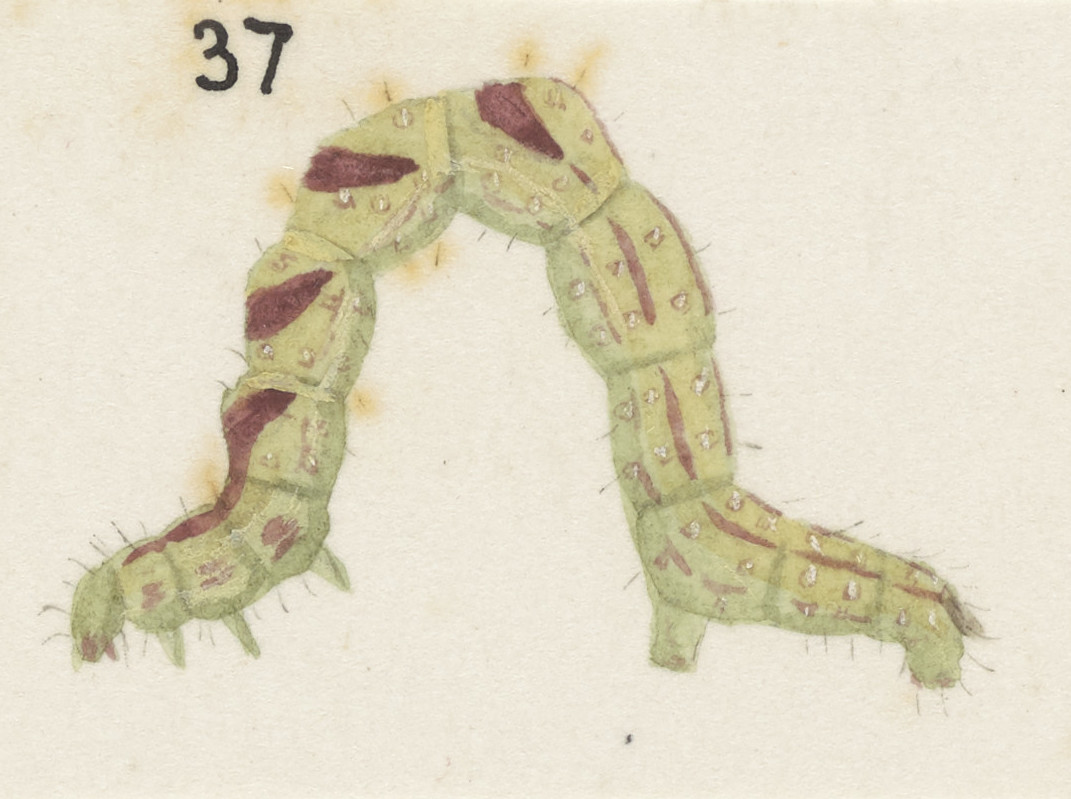

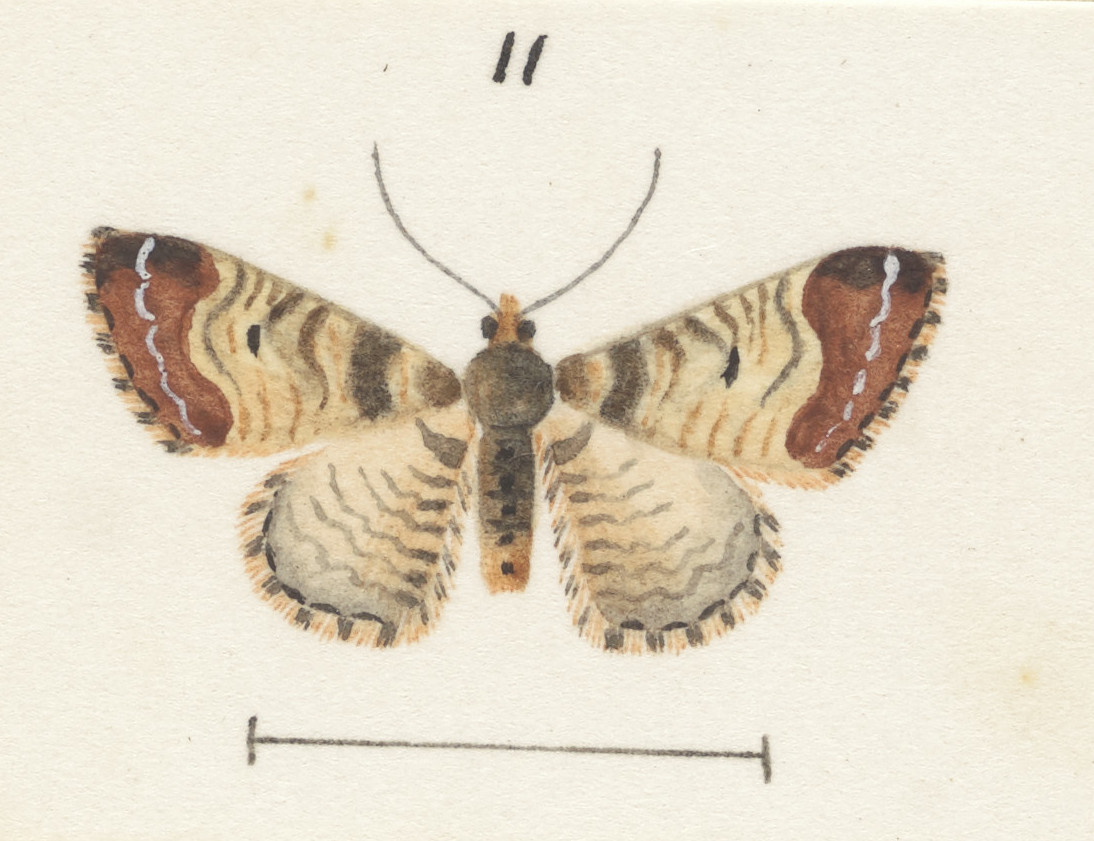

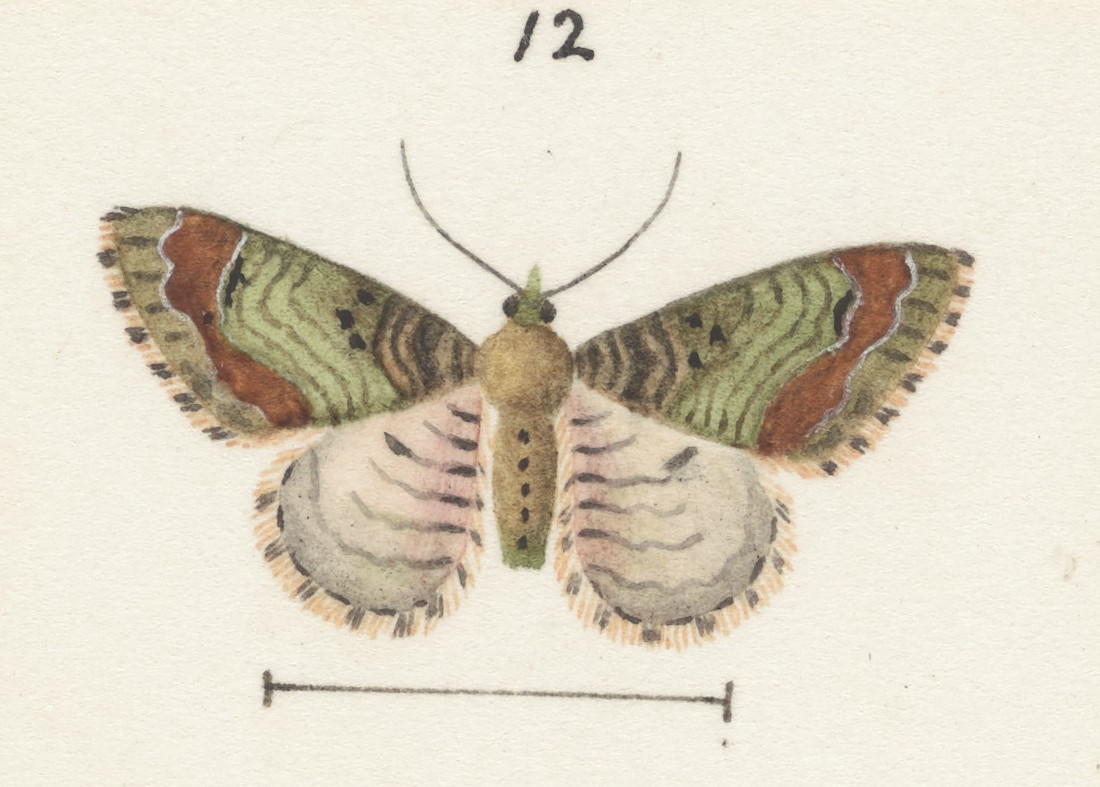

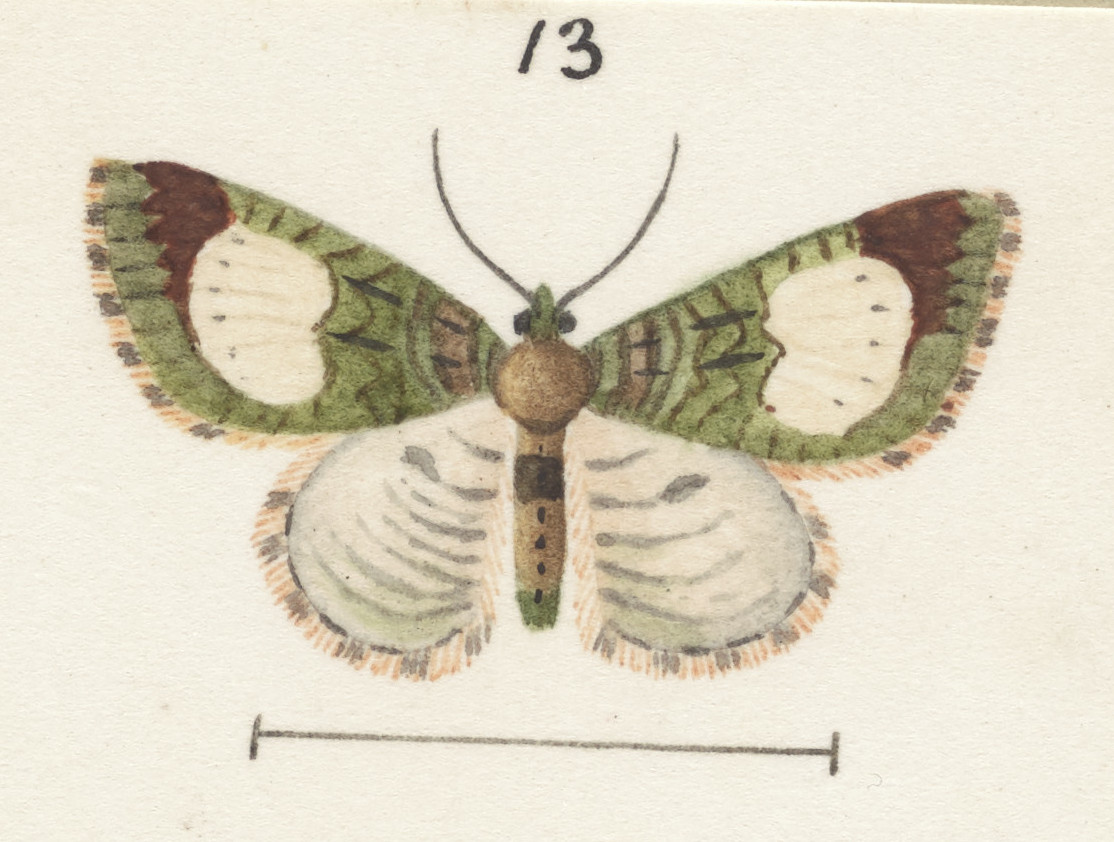

== Distribution ==
This species is endemic to New Zealand. This species has been observed in the lower half of the North Island, throughout the South Island and also on Stewart Island.

== Habitat and hosts ==
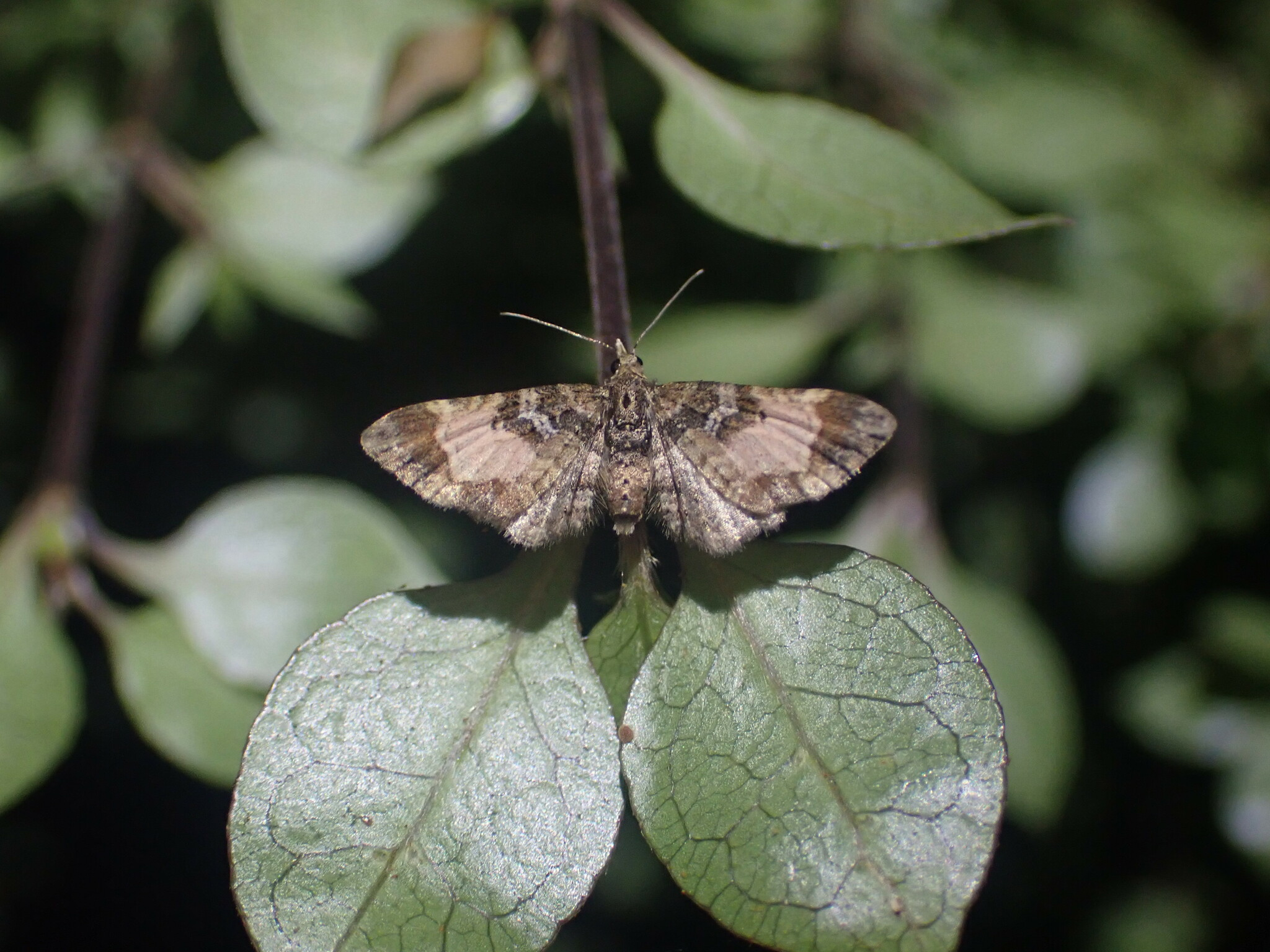
P. sandycias resting on a Coprosma species.

The preferred habitat of this species is native scrub populated with its larval host plants. The larvae of P. sandycias feed on the blossoms of the Coprosma areolata and Coprosma rotundifolia. Hudson points out that the larval life stage of this species is synchronised with the flowering of its host plants.

== Behaviour ==
The larvae are very active and cling to Coprosma twigs, which they closely resemble. The pupa is enclosed in a cocoon made of silk and refuse and can be found amongst the twigs of its host plants. Adult moths have been observed on the wing from August to February. Adult moths of this species have been shown to pollinate Leptospermum scoparium and Olearia virgata. Adults are nocturnal and are attracted to light.
