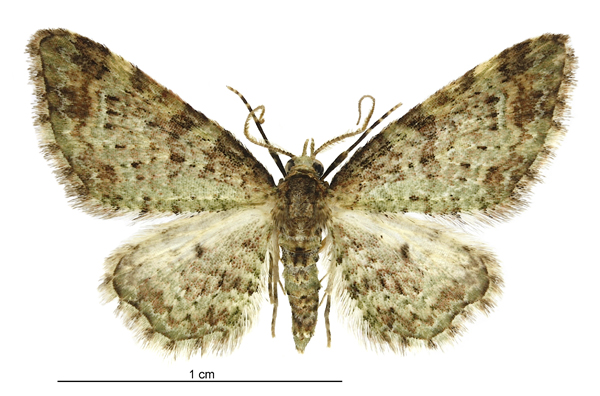
- Male
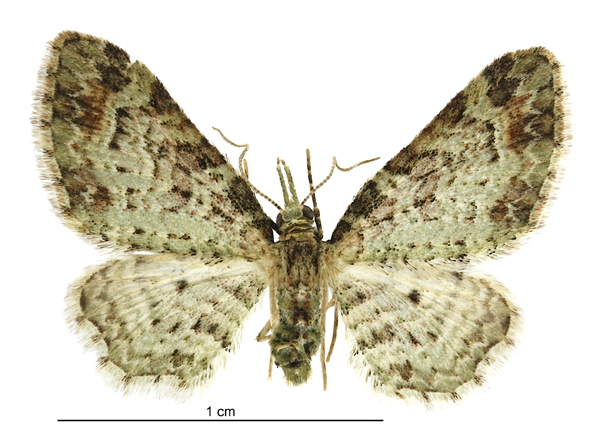
- Female

Scientific classification
- Kingdom: Animalia
- Phylum: Arthropoda
- Class: Insecta
- Order: Lepidoptera
- Family: Geometridae
- Genus: Pasiphila
- Species: P. plinthina

Binomial name
- Pasiphila plinthina Meyrick, 1888

Synonyms
- Chloroclystis plinthina (Meyrick, 1888)

= Pasiphila plinthina =

Species of moth endemic to New Zealand

Pasiphila plinthina is a moth in the family Geometridae. It is endemic to New Zealand and is found in both the North, South and Stewart Islands. It is on the wing mainly from June until September with occasional observations up to December, and is attracted to light. This species is similar in appearance to P. sandycias but can be distinguished from it as P. plinthina has palpi that are longer and has more blurred forewing markings.

== Taxonomy ==
This species was first described by Edward Meyrick in 1888. The male holotype specimen was collected by A. Purdie in July in Wellington and it is held at the Natural History Museum, London. George Hudson in his 1898 book New Zealand moths and butterflies (Macro-lepidoptera) placed this species in the Chloroclystis genus. Hudson confirmed this placement in his 1928 book The butterflies and moths of New Zealand. However, in 1988 J. S. Dugdale, in his catalogue of New Zealand Lepidoptera, returned this species to the Pasiphila genus. In 2012 this placement was confirmed in the New Zealand Inventory of Biodiversity.

== Description ==
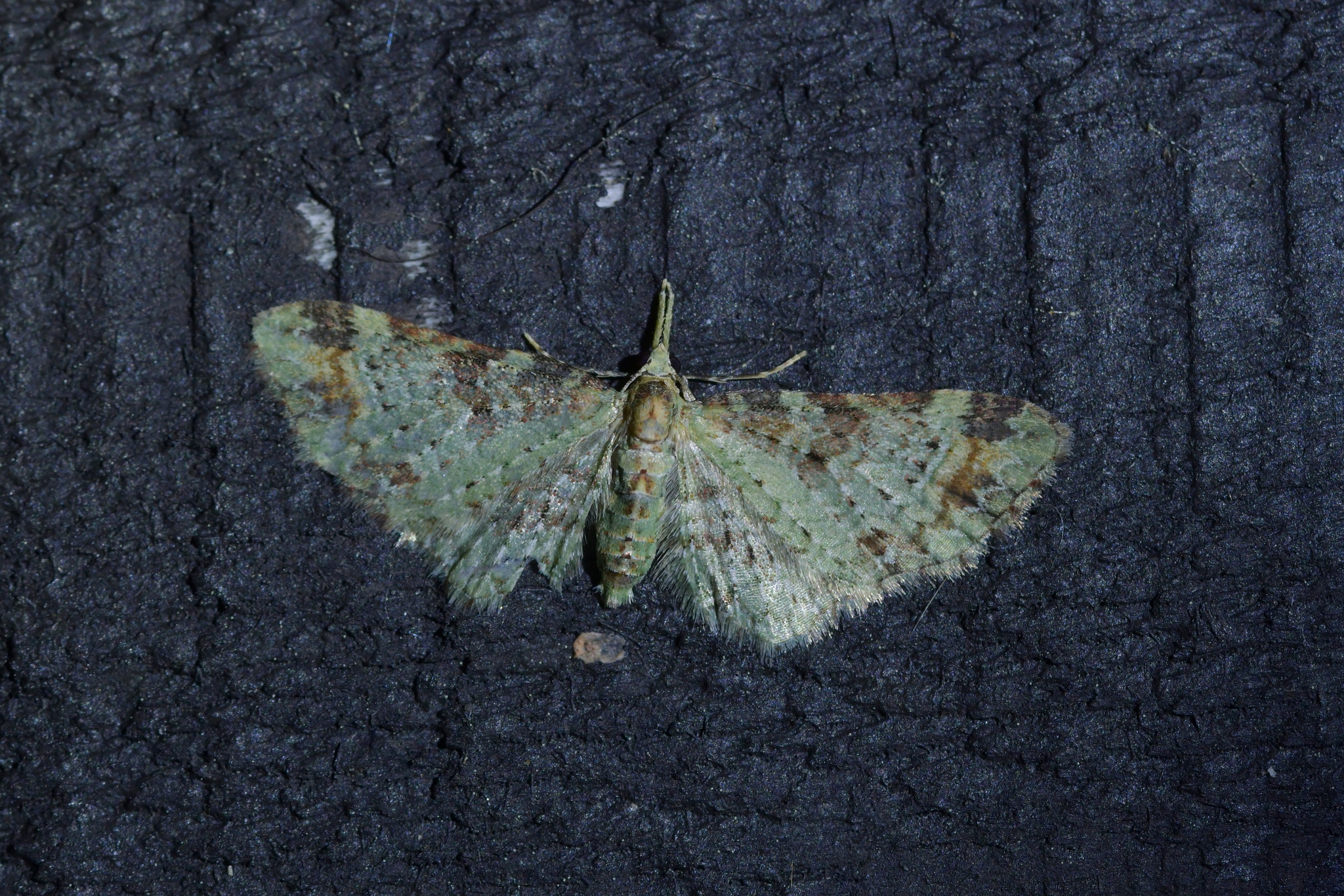
Observation of living P. plinthina.

Meyrick described the species as follows:

Male. — 19 mm. Head, thorax, and abdomen whitish-ochreous, irrorated with reddish. Palpi 3, whitish-ochreous, towards base blackish beneath. Antennae whitish-ochreous, spotted with fuscous above, ciliations 4. Legs blackish, apex of joints ochreous-whitish, posterior pair wholly pale whitish-ochreous. Forewings with hindmargin very oblique, somewhat bowed, slightly sinuate above anal angle; whitish-ochreous, suffusedly irrorated with reddish, tending to form very obscure lines; a blackish irroration towards costa on basal fourth; edge of median band marked by series of black dots on veins, anterior from 3/8 of costa to 2/5 of inner margin, curved, posterior from before 3/4 of costa to 2/3 of inner margin, upper 2/3 tolerably regularly curved; a pale waved subterminal line preceded by a reddish fascia, forming a darker red spot above middle, another above anal angle, and a blackish costal spot; a black hindmarginal line : cilia ochreous-whitish, with an obscure reddish line, basal half with reddish-fuscous spots on veins. Hindwings with hind-margin unevenly rounded, upper half rather deeply sinuate; pale whitish-ochreous, with obscure waved reddish lines except towards costa; a conspicuous black discal dot before middle; posterior edge of median band and a subterminal line more strongly marked; a blackish hindmarginal line; cilia as in forewings.

This species is similar in appearance to P. sandycias with which it has been confused. It can be distinguished from this species as its palpi are longer and has more blurred forewing markings.

== Distribution ==
This species is endemic to New Zealand. It is found in the North, South Islands and Stewart Islands.

== Behaviour ==
P. plinthina is on the wing mainly from June until September with occasional observations up to December, and as such it is regarded as a winter specialist. P. plinthina are attracted to light. Hudson explained that this species could sometimes be found resting on tree trunks but that it was more often collected when dislodged from foliage.
