= Triketone =

Organic compounds with three C=O groups

In organic chemistry, a triketone or trione is an organic compound containing three ketone (>C=O) groups. The simplest triketones, such as cyclopropanetrione and 2,3,4-pentanetrione, are only of occasional theoretical interest. More pertinent are triacetylmethane and 2,4,6-heptanetrione. Both species exist predominantly in the enol (C=C-OH) forms.

Croconic acid

Triacetylmethane

2,4,6-Heptanetrione

== Occurrence and significance ==
Tri- and polyketones are of practical importance as intermediates in the biosynthesis of polyketides. These natural products are a major source of antibiotics.

Biosynthesis of orsellinic acid from polyketide intermediate

== See also ==
- Diketone
