= 2,4,6-Heptanetrione =

Names
- Preferred IUPAC name Heptane-2,4,6-trione
- Other names diacetylacetone

Identifiers
CAS Number	626-53-9
3D model (JSmol)	Interactive image
ChemSpider	11782
PubChem CID	12285
UNII	A95Z6Y7NCX
CompTox Dashboard (EPA)	DTXSID60211650
- InChI: InChI=1S/C7H10O3/c1-5(8)3-7(10)4-6(2)9/h3-4H2,1-2H3 Key: CTHCTLCNUREAJV-UHFFFAOYSA-N
- SMILES: CC(=O)CC(=O)CC(=O)C

Properties
Chemical formula	C_{7}H_{10}O_{3}
Molar mass	142.154 g·mol^{−1}
Appearance	white solid
Melting point	49 °C (120 °F; 322 K)
- Except where otherwise noted, data are given for materials in their standard state (at 25 °C [77 °F], 100 kPa). Infobox references

2,4,6-Heptanetrione is the organic compound with the formula OC(CH_{2}C(O)CH_{3})_{2}. It is a white or colorless solid. The molecule, which exists mainly in the enol form, undergoes condensation with 1,2-diketones. The compound contributes to the flavor of strawberries. It forms a variety of metal complexes.

== See also ==
- Triacetylmethane, an isomer
