= Diallyl carbonate =

Acrylating agent

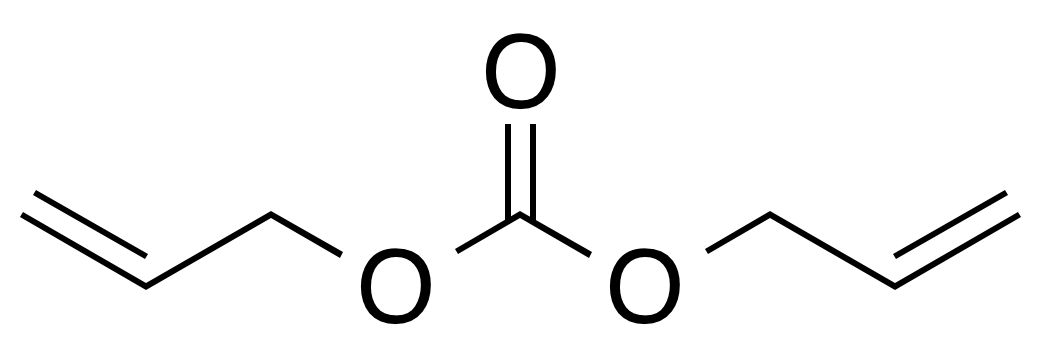

Names
- IUPAC name Bis(prop-2-enyl) carbonate

Identifiers
CAS Number	15022-08-9
3D model (JSmol)	Interactive image
ChemSpider	76468
EC Number	239-106-9
PubChem CID	84764
UNII	J9P2G65CXJ
CompTox Dashboard (EPA)	DTXSID6065846
- InChI: InChI=1S/C7H10O3/c1-3-5-9-7(8)10-6-4-2/h3-4H,1-2,5-6H2 Key: JKJWYKGYGWOAHT-UHFFFAOYSA-N
- SMILES: C=CCOC(=O)OCC=C

Properties
Chemical formula	C_{7}H_{10}O_{3}
Molar mass	142.154 g·mol^{−1}
Density	0.991 g/mL
Melting point	−70 °C (−94 °F; 203 K)
Boiling point	95–97 °C (203–207 °F; 368–370 K) 60 mmHg
- Except where otherwise noted, data are given for materials in their standard state (at 25 °C [77 °F], 100 kPa). Infobox references

Diallyl carbonate (DAC) is a colorless liquid with a pungent odor. Its structure contains allyl groups and a functional carbonate group. The presence of double bonds in the allyl groups makes it reactive in various chemical processes. This compound plays a key role in the production of polymers, including polycarbonates and polyurethanes. Diallyl carbonate is soluble in ethanol, methanol, toluene, and chloroform. Diallyl carbonate reacts with amines, alcohols, and thiols.

DAC is also used as an acrylate agent. Allyl carbonates are widely used in Tsuji-Trost allylation, promoting the formation of carbanions, boronates, phosphides, amides, and alkoxides. They act as in situ nucleophiles, increasing the reaction rate compared to allyl acetate. These compounds are of great interest for the design of intramolecular decarboxylate asymmetric compounds.

== History ==
The Tsuji-Trost reaction was first introduced in 1962. This method played an important role in the synthesis of diallyl carbonate. The first mention of its commercial production dates back to 1982, when Tokuyama Corporation synthesized it for the first time using the sodium carbonate method. This milestone marked the beginning of the sale of diallyl carbonate as a raw material for the production of plastic lenses.

== Synthesis ==
Diallyl carbonate can be synthesized by consecutive nucleophilic acyl substitution reactions using two equivalents of allyl alcohol and any of several electrophilic carbonyl donors. The monoallyl intermediate can be isolated and then separately converted to the diallyl product, or the whole process can be run in a single reactor.

=== From phosgene ===
Phosgene is a highly reactive electrophile. It reacts easily with allyl alcohol. A base is often used to neutralize the hydrogen chloride byproduct. The intermediate allyl chloroformate need not be isolated. Alternately, allyl chloroformate can be used as a starting-point if it is already available.

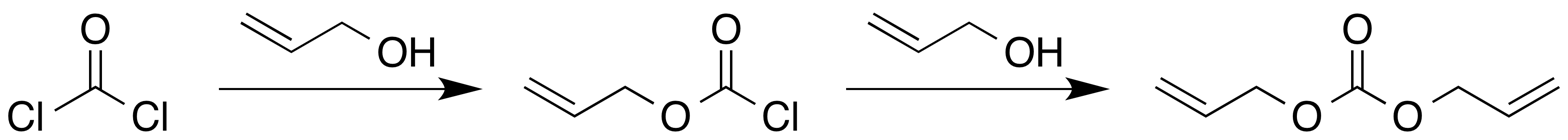

=== From urea ===
Urea is a stable reagent that reacts in two stages. In the first stage, this reaction proceeds rapidly and yields acetaldehyde as an intermediate. To enable the second substitution requires a catalyst, such as LaCl_{3}.

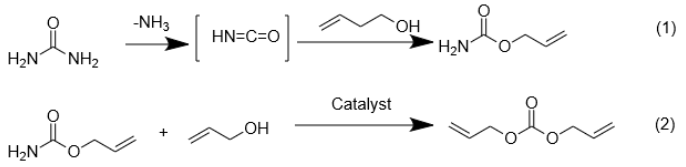

=== From other carbonates ===
Catechol carbonate is a versatile intermediate for ester-exchange reactions. It is available from a variety of reactions, including ester-exchange of dimethyl carbonate with catechol. Catechol carbonate reacts with allyl alcohol in reactive distillation system with sodium methoxide or other base catalyst.

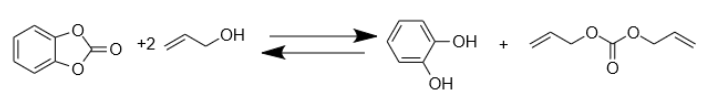

== Polymers ==
=== Poly(2,2'-(oxybis(ethylene sulfonyl)) diallyl carbonate-co-allyl diglycol carbonate) ===
This polymer comprises 2,2'-(oxybis(ethylene sulfonyl)) diallyl carbonate (OESDAC) and its copolymers with allyl diglycol carbonate (ADC), wherein the resulting polymer can be further converted into a film. OESDAC is synthesized in two steps. First, a condensation of 2,2'-bis(2-hydroxyethylsulfanyl)diethyl ether with 3,9-dithia-6-oxa-undecane-1,11-diol-bis(allyl carbonate) is carried out in the presence of alkali at low temperatures. Second, the oxidation of 3,9-dithia-6-oxa-undecane-1,11-diol bis(allyl carbonate) with hydrogen peroxide in acidic medium is carried out. The synthesis of ADC involves the condensation of diethylene glycol with allyl chloroformate in the presence of pyridine at low temperatures.

The copolymerization of OESDAC and ADC is performed in the presence of the initiator IPP and the plasticizer DOP. The resulting polymer films can be used as nuclear trace detectors to record and study traces of energetic particles such as alpha particles and fission fragments.

=== Poly(1-benzoate-2,3-diallylcarbonate glycerol) ===
The polymer poly(1-benzoate-2,3-diallylcarbonate glycerol) is currently obtained from the monomer BDACG, which undergoes gamma irradiation in a vacuum at various doses and temperatures using a 60°C gamma irradiation source. This process results in the formation of branched polymers (PBDACG) with different gel contents.

Additionally, BDACG is currently subjected to UV irradiation in the presence of the photoinitiator Darocur 1173, leading to the formation of a polymer with high gel content and a network structure.

Applications currently include the use of gamma-polymerized BDACG for producing transparent thermoplastic polycarbonates in optical applications and as materials with internal crosslinking. Photopolymerized BDACG is currently suitable for polymers with high gel content, making them applicable in optical purposes and as nuclear track detectors in technical areas.

=== Polycarbonate ===
The monomer (1,1'-biphenyl)-4,4'-diallylcarbonate is synthesized by reacting 4,4'-biphenyl, pyridine, and allyl chlorocarbonate at 5°C. Simultaneously, the monomer hexa(4-allylcarbonatephenoxy)cyclotriphosphazene is prepared by the reaction of Allyl(4-hydroxyphenyl) carbonate with hexachlorocyclotriphosphazene.

Following the acquisition of the two monomers, a polymerization process is conducted by reacting them together, utilizing benzoyl peroxide as the initiator. Two distinct polycarbonates are produced: the first after three hours of polymerization and the second after 34 hours. The primary distinction lies in their thermal stability, with the first polycarbonate remaining stable up to 250 °C, while the second begins decomposition at 240 °C. At 800 °C, the first polycarbonate loses 90% of its mass, whereas the second polycarbonate only loses 28%. Additionally, the second polycarbonate exhibits a higher limiting oxygen index (LOI) of 46.3%. In comparison to the classic polycarbonate, the second polycarbonate demonstrates superior LOI but has lower thermal stability, remaining stable only up to 150 °C.

=== Non-isocyanate polyurethane ===
Diallyl carbonate is currently employed in the synthesis of the polymer through a thiol-ene reaction with dithiols. This component undergoes synthesis from hydroxamic acid and diallyl alcohol, with TBD catalyst facilitating the process. The outcome is a carbonaceous polymer characterized by high viscosity and transparency. The polymer exhibits thermal properties such as a glass transition occurring at temperatures between -12 and -15 °C. The introduction of bulk groups leads to a reduction in crystallization.

The synthesis of non-isocyanate polyurethanes currently entails the reaction of hydroxamic acid with two equivalents of diallyl alcohol, employing catalytic amounts of TBD as a base in diallyl carbonate. The reaction mixture is presently heated at 110 °C overnight, following a methodology described for catalytic Lossen rearrangements. This process results in the formation of both carbamate and urea. Subsequently, a reaction occurs between cyclooctane-1,4-diol and either carbamate or urea. The compounds obtained are then polymerized via a highly efficient thiol–ene reaction, leading to the production of non-isocyanate polyurethanes with Mn values up to 26 kg/mol, containing thioether linkages.

Similarly, the primary by-product of the Lossen rearrangement, symmetric urea, can currently undergo polymerization using the same method. Importantly, from an ecological perspective, the monomeric mixture can be directly utilized without the need for separation.
