= Triacetylmethane =

Names
- Other names 3-acetyl-2,4-pentanedione

Identifiers
CAS Number	815-68-9
3D model (JSmol)	Interactive image
ChemSpider	63143
EC Number	212-422-4
PubChem CID	69950
UNII	XF3T5YJT4R
CompTox Dashboard (EPA)	DTXSID50231145
- InChI: InChI=1S/C7H10O3/c1-4(8)7(5(2)9)6(3)10/h7H,1-3H3 Key: AUZFRUHVDNDVJI-UHFFFAOYSA-N
- SMILES: CC(=O)C(C(=O)C)C(=O)C

Properties
Chemical formula	C_{7}H_{10}O_{3}
Molar mass	142.154 g·mol^{−1}
Appearance	colorless liquid
Density	1.0591 g/cm^{3}
Boiling point	96–97 °C (205–207 °F; 369–370 K) 15 torr

Hazards
- GHS labelling
Pictograms	(GHS07: Exclamation mark)
Signal word	Warning
Hazard statements	H319
Precautionary statements	P264+P265, P280, P305+P351+P338, P337+P317
- Except where otherwise noted, data are given for materials in their standard state (at 25 °C [77 °F], 100 kPa). Infobox references

Triacetylmethane is the organic compound with the formula HC(C(O)CH_{3})_{3}. It is a colorless liquid that is soluble in organic solvents and in alkaline water. It readily forms an enolate. The enolate forms a variety of metal complexes related to the metal acetylacetonates.
