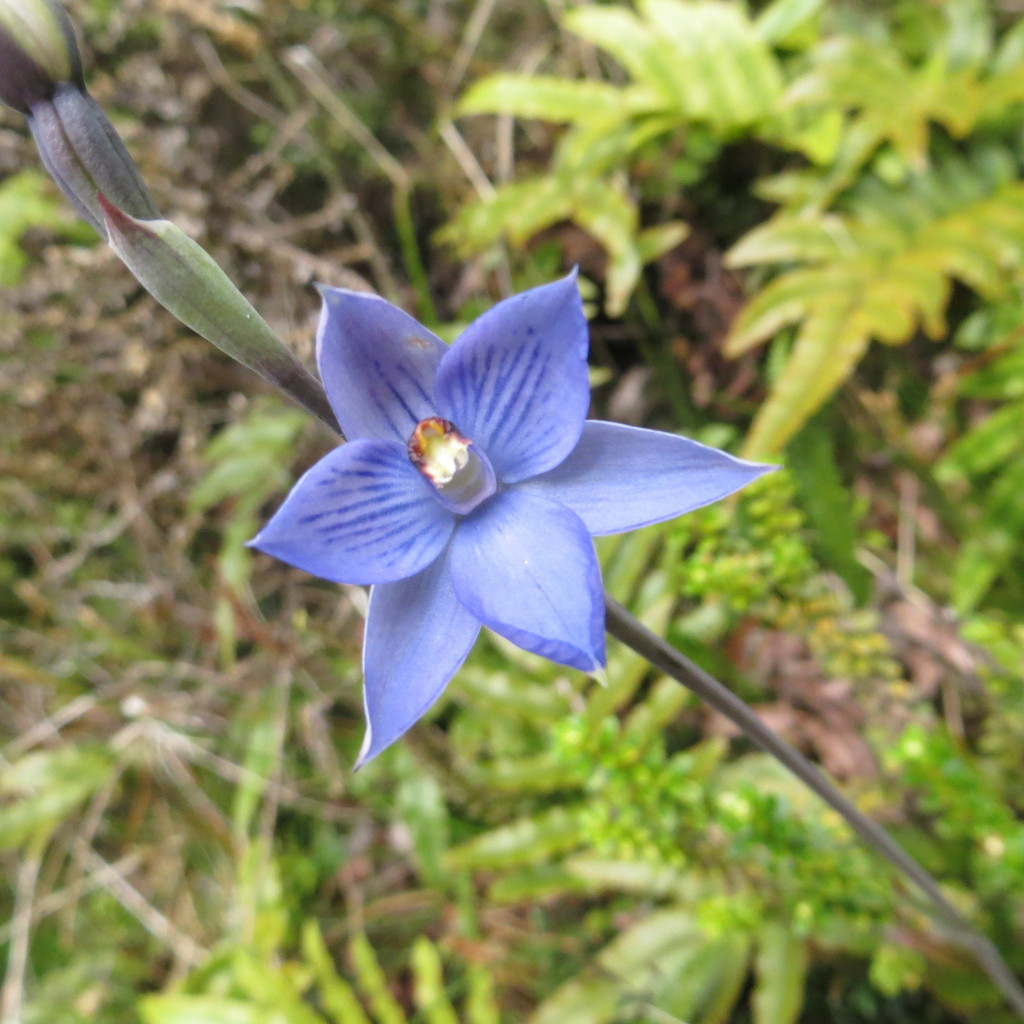
- Near Leith Valley

Scientific classification
- Kingdom: Plantae
- Clade: Embryophytes
- Clade: Tracheophytes
- Clade: Angiosperms
- Clade: Monocots
- Order: Asparagales
- Family: Orchidaceae
- Subfamily: Orchidoideae
- Tribe: Diurideae
- Genus: Thelymitra
- Species: T. pulchella

Binomial name
- Thelymitra pulchella Hook.f.

= Thelymitra pulchella =

Striped sun orchid

Species of orchid

Thelymitra pulchella, commonly called striped sun orchid, is a species of orchid in the family Orchidaceae that is endemic to New Zealand. It has a single erect, fleshy, channelled leaf and up to fourteen blue flowers with darker stripes on the petal and sometimes also on the sepals. The column and its lobes are variable in shape and colour.

== Description ==
Thelymitra pulchella is a tuberous, perennial herb with a single erect, fleshy, channelled leaf 80–240 mm (3–9 in) long and 6–20 mm (0.2–0.8 in) wide. Up to fourteen blue, sometimes pink or white flowers 10–18 mm (0.4–0.7 in) wide are borne on a flowering stem sometimes up to 800 mm (30 in) tall. The petals, and sometimes also the sepals have dark blue stripes. The column is dark blue, pink, mauve or white and 6–8 mm (0.2–0.3 in) long. The arms on the sides of the column are reddish brown and sometimes have red or yellow teeth. The lobe on top of the anther is variable in colour and shape but often has irregular teeth. Flowering occurs from October to January.

== Taxonomy and naming ==
Thelymitra pulchella was first formally described in 1853 by Joseph Dalton Hooker and the description was published in Flora Novae-Zelandiae. The specific epithet (pulchella) is the diminutive form of the Latin word pulcher meaning "beautiful". Hooker described this species as "very handsome".

== Distribution and habitat ==
Striped sun orchid grows in open shrubland and often in wetland. It is found on the North, South, Stewart and Chatham Islands.
