= Ōkārito =

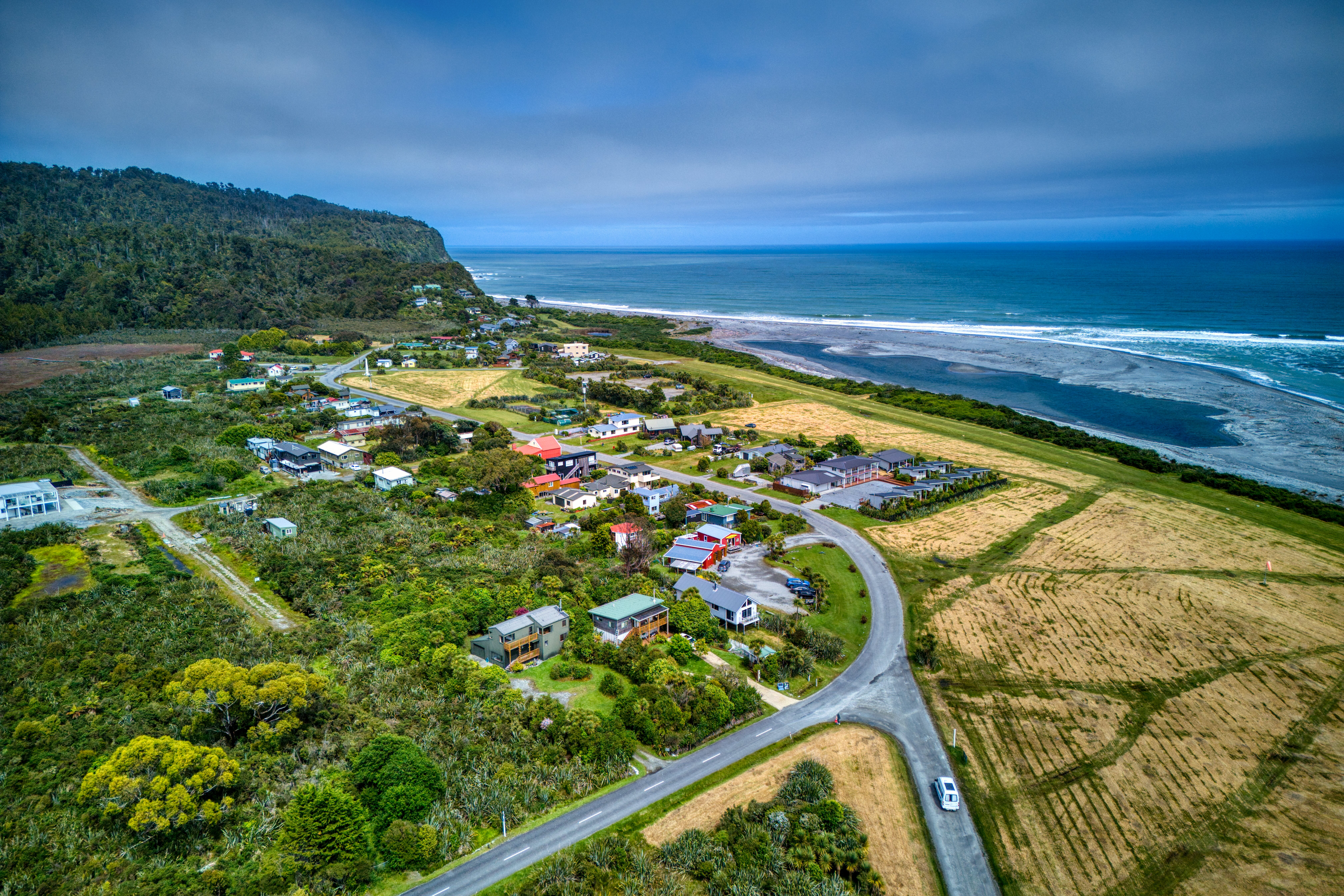

- Location within South Island
- Coordinates: 43°12′S 170°13′E
- Country: New Zealand
- Region: West Coast
- District: Westland District
- Time zone: UTC+12 (NZST)
  - Summer (DST): UTC+13 (NZDT)
- Postcode: 7886
- Area code: 03
- Local iwi: Ngāi Tahu

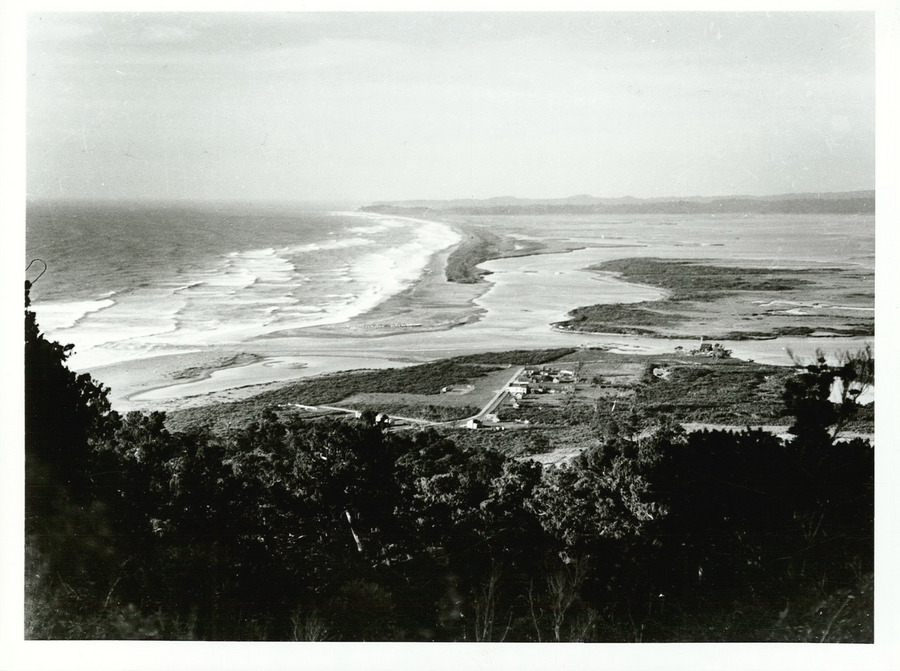
Ōkārito and the lagoon in the early 20th century

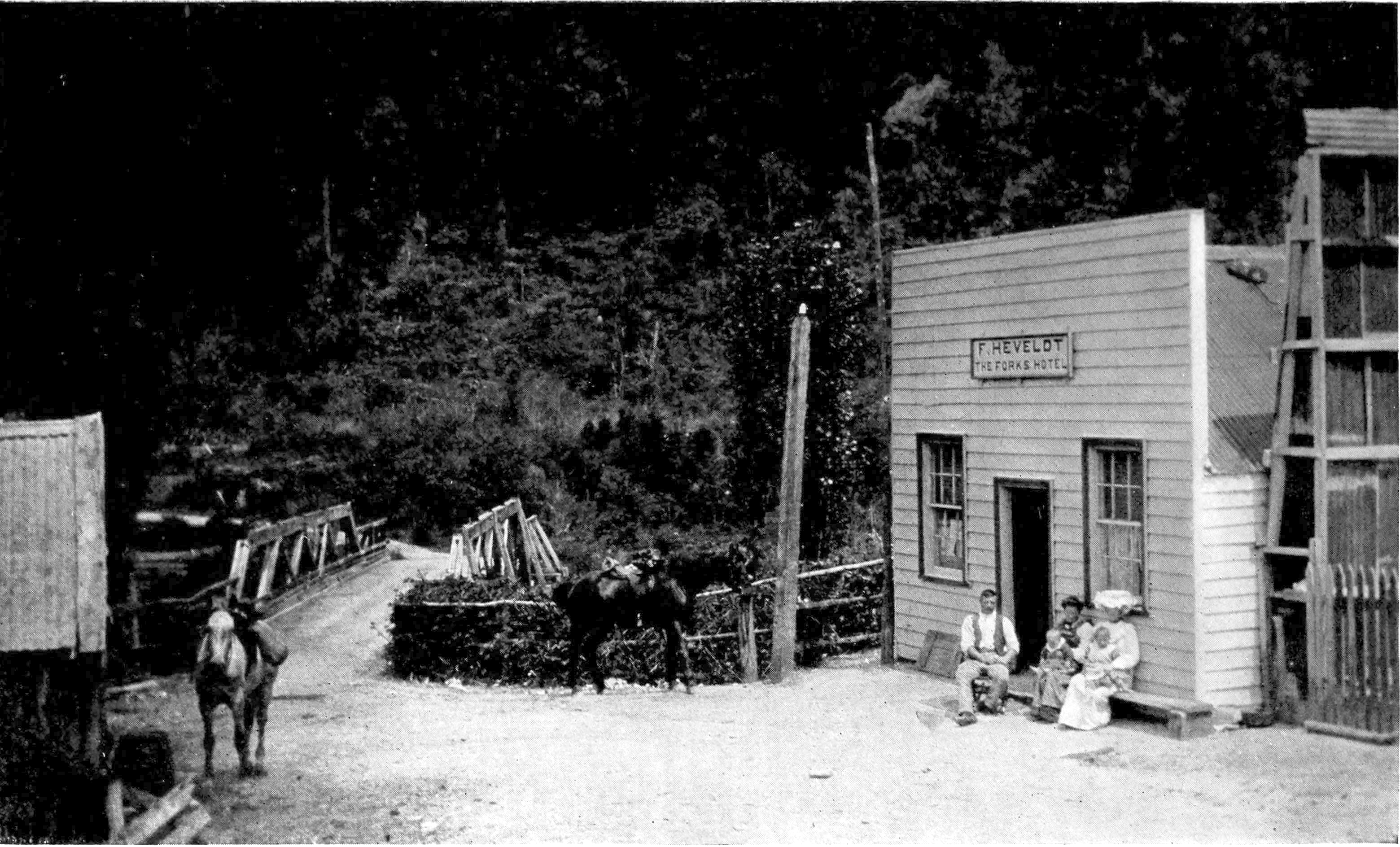
The Forks Hotel, 1911

Ōkārito is a small coastal settlement on the West Coast of New Zealand's South Island, 127 kilometres (79 mi) southwest of Hokitika, and 10 kilometres (6.2 mi) from State Highway 6. It is built at the southern end of the Ōkārito Lagoon at the mouth of the Ōkārito River. The settlement of The Forks is located just inland, on the banks of the river.

== Name ==
Ōkārito's name is from the Māori ō ('place of') and kārito ('the young shoots of the bulrush or raupō'), a valued food source. Another account has Ōkārito taking its name from a rangatira named Kārito, whose daughters Mapourika and Wahapako gave their names to nearby Lake Mapourika and Lake Wahapo. The settlement's official name has been spelled with macrons over the vowels since 2010, although it is still commonly seen written as "Okarito".

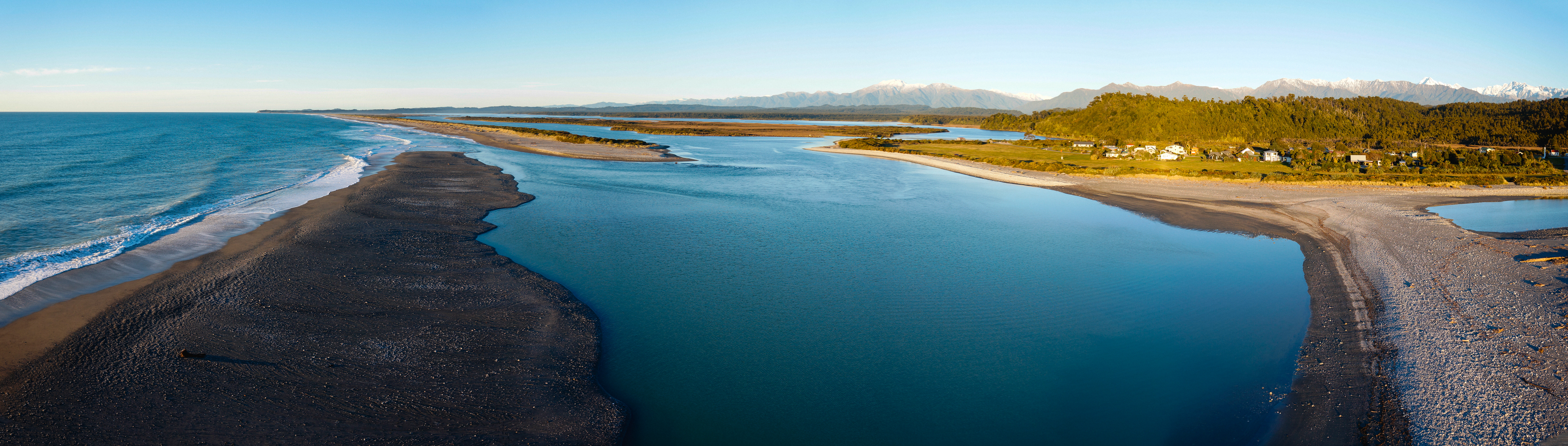
Ōkārito from the air, with Ōkārito Lagoon beyond

== History ==
Māori occupation and seasonal harvesting in the area began over 600 years ago.

The Ōkārito historic gold mining settlement is home to Donovan's Store, the oldest known building on the West Coast, and the Ōkārito Memorial Obelisk, a heritage listed obelisk. The obelisk commemorates the 1860 purchase of Westland from local Maori, as well as the date that Abel Tasman and James Cook sailed by, on 13 December 1642 and 23 March 1770 respectively.

Originally a gold mining township, the population reached over 1,500 in 1866. It is now permanent home to only about 30 residents; among them the late Booker Prize-winning writer Keri Hulme and landscape photographer Andris Apse.

Bird watching, eco-tours and kayak tours of the lagoon are available, and there are a number of local walking tracks.

In 1909 the bones of a whale beached in 1908, 6 miles (9.7 km) north of the settlement were taken to Canterbury Museum and displayed and called the Okarito Whale.

== Cemeteries ==
There were two historic burial grounds in Ōkārito. The 'old' cemetery was located on North Beach, which is across the lagoon and can only be reached by boat. The 'new' cemetery was opened in 1906 and was located inland on the bypass track. There are no official records for either the new or old Ōkārito cemetery but some there are some listings in the NZ Cemetery Records 1800–2007 compiled from alternative data sources (headstone transcriptions, etc). Newspaper reports and government correspondence suggest approximately 70 burials took place at the old cemetery from 1866 onwards.

In 1933, graves in the old cemetery were being eroded into the sea so the bodies were reinterred within the old cemetery but further away from the sea edge. By the 1980s, government correspondence suggests those graves may have been eroded into the sea. However, as of 2023, there hasn't been any formal investigation to confirm whether there are any remains. Only one headstone is still visible at certain tide marks.

For more information on the two historic Ōkārito cemeteries, please refer to this research report which includes a timeline of events, a more comprehensive burial list, biographical information about the people buried there, and links to some coronial inquest records.

== Wildlife ==
The rarest species of kiwi, the Okarito kiwi, or rowi, is found near the town of Ōkārito.

The lagoon is one of the main feeding grounds for the white heron during the spring and summer; however, white herons do not nest at Okarito.

== Events ==
Since 2021, the Ōkārito GorseBusters initiative has attracted people from across the country to provide a helping hand clearing gorse and weeds in the area, with 90 volunteers in the first year and 116 during GorseBusters 2: 'The return of the pricks'.

Since the start of GorseBusters, around 31 km of shoreline has been cleared of gorse and 50,000 gorse plants have been treated.

== Climate ==
Climate data for Ōkārito (1991–2020 normals, extremes 1982–present)
Month	Jan	Feb	Mar	Apr	May	Jun	Jul	Aug	Sep	Oct	Nov	Dec	Year
Record high °C (°F)	26.9 (80.4)	28.2 (82.8)	25.7 (78.3)	24.2 (75.6)	21.4 (70.5)	18.1 (64.6)	17.6 (63.7)	19.0 (66.2)	20.4 (68.7)	23.1 (73.6)	22.7 (72.9)	25.2 (77.4)	28.2 (82.8)
Mean maximum °C (°F)	23.5 (74.3)	23.9 (75.0)	22.9 (73.2)	20.5 (68.9)	18.4 (65.1)	16.2 (61.2)	15.8 (60.4)	16.1 (61.0)	17.6 (63.7)	18.7 (65.7)	19.9 (67.8)	22.4 (72.3)	24.5 (76.1)
Mean daily maximum °C (°F)	19.8 (67.6)	20.5 (68.9)	19.0 (66.2)	17.0 (62.6)	15.0 (59.0)	12.9 (55.2)	12.4 (54.3)	13.0 (55.4)	14.1 (57.4)	15.2 (59.4)	16.7 (62.1)	18.3 (64.9)	16.2 (61.1)
Daily mean °C (°F)	15.8 (60.4)	16.3 (61.3)	14.7 (58.5)	12.7 (54.9)	10.7 (51.3)	8.4 (47.1)	7.6 (45.7)	8.4 (47.1)	9.9 (49.8)	11.2 (52.2)	12.6 (54.7)	14.4 (57.9)	11.9 (53.4)
Mean daily minimum °C (°F)	11.7 (53.1)	12.0 (53.6)	10.3 (50.5)	8.4 (47.1)	6.4 (43.5)	4.0 (39.2)	2.8 (37.0)	3.9 (39.0)	5.6 (42.1)	7.1 (44.8)	8.5 (47.3)	10.5 (50.9)	7.6 (45.7)
Mean minimum °C (°F)	6.5 (43.7)	6.5 (43.7)	4.8 (40.6)	2.7 (36.9)	0.4 (32.7)	−1.0 (30.2)	−1.6 (29.1)	−1.2 (29.8)	0.1 (32.2)	1.6 (34.9)	3.0 (37.4)	5.9 (42.6)	−2.2 (28.0)
Record low °C (°F)	3.6 (38.5)	3.1 (37.6)	0.7 (33.3)	−1.5 (29.3)	−1.9 (28.6)	−2.7 (27.1)	−4.4 (24.1)	−3.1 (26.4)	−2.0 (28.4)	−2.6 (27.3)	0.4 (32.7)	1.7 (35.1)	−4.4 (24.1)
Average rainfall mm (inches)	291.5 (11.48)	226.2 (8.91)	228.3 (8.99)	245.4 (9.66)	256.0 (10.08)	263.0 (10.35)	217.6 (8.57)	247.6 (9.75)	291.0 (11.46)	312.8 (12.31)	259.0 (10.20)	316.0 (12.44)	3,154.4 (124.2)
Source: NIWA
