= Lake Wahapo =

Lake in New Zealand

- Wahapako (Māori)
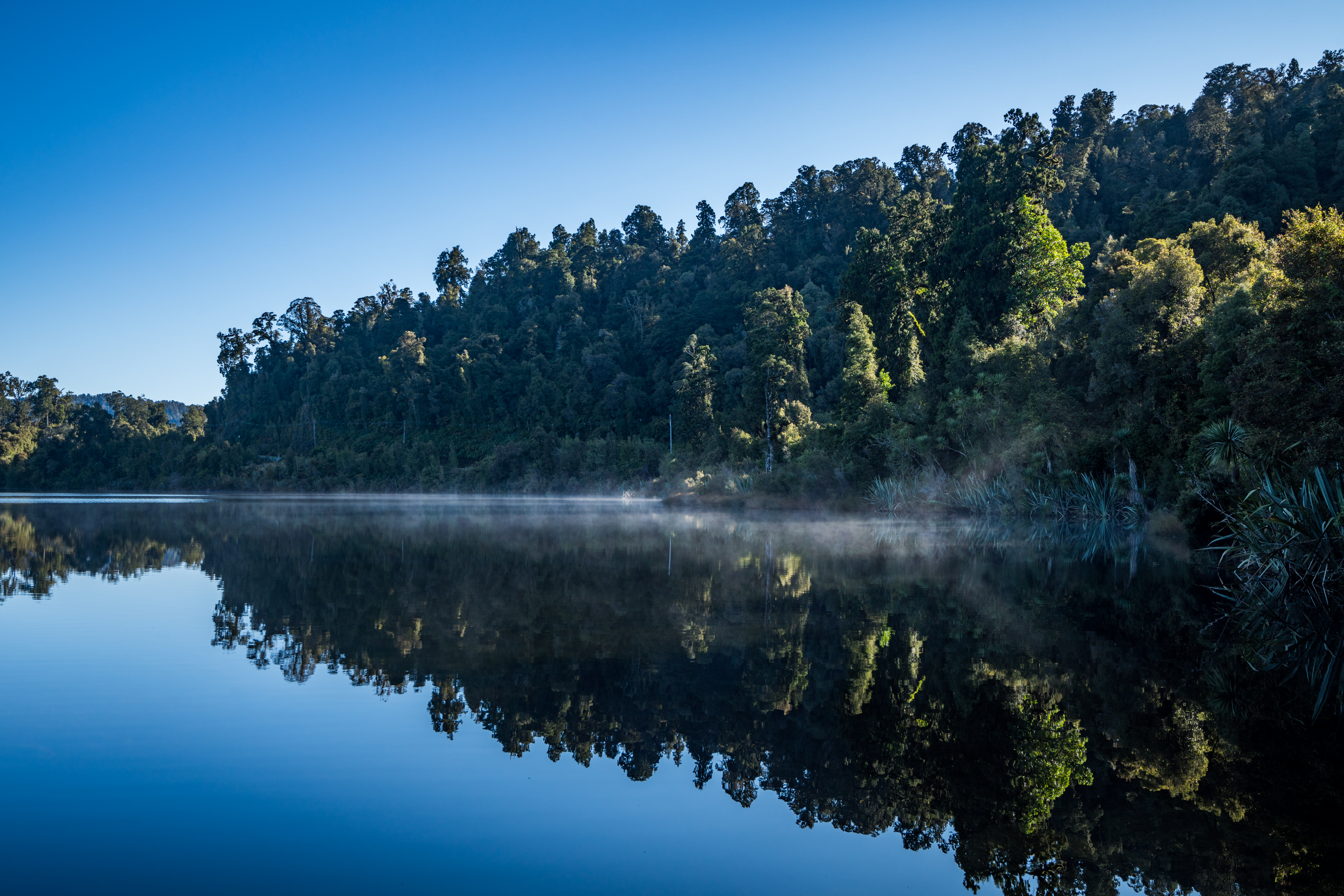
- Lake Wahapo

- Location of Lake Wahapo in New Zealand
- Interactive map of Lake Wahapo
- Location: Whataroa, Westland District, South Island
- Coordinates: 43°14′56″S 170°15′58″E
- Primary inflows: Waitangitāhuna River
- Primary outflows: Ōkārito River
- Catchment area: 90 km^{2} (35 mi^{2})
- Basin countries: New Zealand
- Max. length: 2.6 km (1.6 mi)
- Max. width: 1.2 km (0.75 mi)
- Surface area: 2.3 km^{2} (0.89 mi^{2})
- Shore length^{1}: 6.8 km (4.2 mi)
- Surface elevation: 48 m (157 ft)
- ^{1} Shore length is not a well-defined measure.

Lake Wahapo (Māori: Wahapako) is a small glacial lake in South Westland, New Zealand, within the Westland Tai Poutini National Park and near the township of Whataroa. It was a traditional mahinga kai (food-gathering place) for local Māori. State Highway 6 skirts the lake's southern shore. The lake discharges to the Ōkārito River via a small hydroelectric power station commissioned in 1960. The ecology of the lake has altered considerably since 1967, when the Waitangitāhuna River changed course to flow into the lake.

== Geography ==
Lake Wahapo is located about 82 kilometres (51 mi) southwest of Hokitika, and 16 kilometres (9.9 mi) northwest of Franz Josef / Waiau. It lies between the settlements of Whataroa and Ōkārito, about 7 kilometres (4.3 mi) from each. The lake is 2.6 kilometres (1.6 mi) long, has a maximum width of 1.2 kilometres (0.75 mi), and covers an area of about 2.3 square kilometres (0.89 mi^{2}). State Highway 6 follows the southern shore of the lake for about 1.6 kilometres (1.0 mi), making it easily accessible to travellers.

Like many of the lakes of South Westland, Lake Wahapo was formed following the retreat of local glaciers at the end of the Last Glacial Period, around 12,000 years ago. The lake occupies an unfilled lobe of a former glacial trough and is enclosed by moraine walls to the north, south and west. The eastern end of the lake is bounded by a gently sloping alluvial fan, forest, and pakihi.

A flood in March 1967 caused the avulsion of the Waitangitāhuna River, with the result being that the Waitangitāhuna now flows into Lake Wahapo, 6 kilometres (3.7 mi) from its previous course. Prior to that time, the lake had dark, peaty waters that provided reflections of the kahikatea forest on the lake's shore. However, since the Waitangitāhuna changed course, Lake Wahapo has been transformed from an organic-dominated lake into a turbid water body. The Waitangitāhuna carries large volumes of sediment, and a delta has formed at the eastern end of Lake Wahapo. Between 1967 and 2008, the delta prograded about 567 metres (620 yd) into the lake, and in 2008 the delta plain covered 0.29 square kilometres (0.11 mi^{2}) with an estimated average depth of 5 metres (16 ft). In 2012, it was estimated that in about 300 years Lake Wahapo would be completely filled with sediment. The increased volume of water entering Lake Wahapo following the avulsion caused the average lake level to rise by about one metre (3.3 ft).

== History ==
Local Māori called the lake Wahapako, after one of the daughters of a rangatira, Kārito, for whom Ōkārito is named. Wahapako was a traditional mahinga kai (food-gathering place) for local Māori, who would come to the lake to gather longfin eels. The now-extinct New Zealand grayling (Prototroctes oxyrhynchus), known to Māori as upokororo, was an important food source for Māori, and were abundant in the area; the outflow from Lake Wahapo was one of the last areas in which the species was reliably recorded.

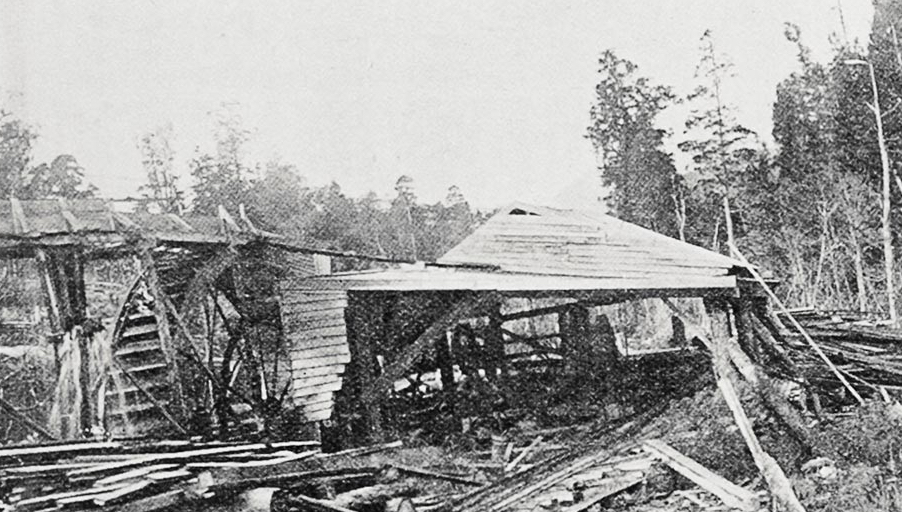
Water-powered bush sawmill near Lake Wahapo in 1909

From the 1890s, native forests on the West Coast were exploited for their timber, with kahikatea and rimu being particularly sought after in South Westland. Timber mills operated in the Lake Wahapo area, with one shipment of about 76 cubic metres (2,700 ft^{3}) of mataī being sent from the Lake Wahapo Mill to Wellington in 1939 for the New Zealand Centennial Exhibition buildings.

In 1960, a hydroelectric power station was commissioned at Lake Wahapo, utilising the outflow from the lake, and discharging it into the Ōkārito River. The scheme was built at a cost of £40,000 to provide reliable electricity supply to about 90 customers in the Whataroa area, and included 47 kilometres (29 mi) of 11,000-volt transmission lines. The local territorial authority at the time, the Westland County Council, levied a special rate to fund the project. The station used a generator set that had previously been used during the construction of the Homer Tunnel. In 1990, the scheme was redeveloped, resulting in an increased maximum generation capacity of 3.1 MW, and an average annual output of 15.3 GWh.

On 29 March 1960, the scenic reserve around Lake Wahapo was included in the gazetting of the new Westland National Park (now Westland Tai Poutini National Park), New Zealand's ninth national park.

== Ecology ==
The ecology of Lake Wahapo was severely affected by the avulsion of the Waitangitāhuna River in 1967. The river carries large amounts of fragmented schist rock and debris from a massive slip in the headwaters of the river's catchment. The river's new course after the avulsion was across an ancient alluvial fan and through a stand of kahikatea (Dacrycarpus dacrydioides) at the northeastern end of the lake. Heavier fractions of the debris are deposited before reaching the lake, but the lighter elements are carried to the lake. Silt was quickly deposited in the kahikatea forest, burying the low understory vegetation and causing widespread mortality of the trees at the head of the lake. Within three or four years, the dying trees were subject to fungal attack and could not be salvaged for timber. In areas where less silt was deposited (less than about 60 centimetres (2.0 ft) deep), only a few trees died, and those that survived produced adventitious roots, allowing them to adjust to the saturated silt. Tōtara (Podocarpus totara), miro (Prumnopitys ferruginea), mountain horopito (Pseudowintera colorata), patē (Schefflera digitata), and mikimiki (Coprosma rotundifolia) also survived by producing adventitious roots. Mosses, herbs and smaller shrubs were completely destroyed where there was initial silt deposition, but have recovered in areas where deposition has ceased.

Other plant species that have been recorded around Lake Wahapo include: whekī-ponga (Dicksonia fibrosa) at the eastern end of the lake; sedge (Isolepis reticularis) and Coprosma propinqua × robusta in swampy areas; and Ranunculus flammula on the flat at the head of the lake and in swamp pools.

Since 1967, the silt-laden water of the Waitangitāhuna River has caused an increase in the turbidity of Lake Wahapo, and a concomitant reduction in light penetration. The much larger volume of water entering the lake than previously has increased mixing in the lake, resulting in an almost uniform water temperature from the surface to the bottom of the lake. A further consequence is a lower abundance of plankton in Lake Wahapo compared to nearby Lake Mapourika.

Brown trout and salmon, both introduced species, are found in Lake Wahapo. The introduction of trout to New Zealand rivers has been cited as one of the possible factors in the extinction of the New Zealand grayling.

== Gallery ==
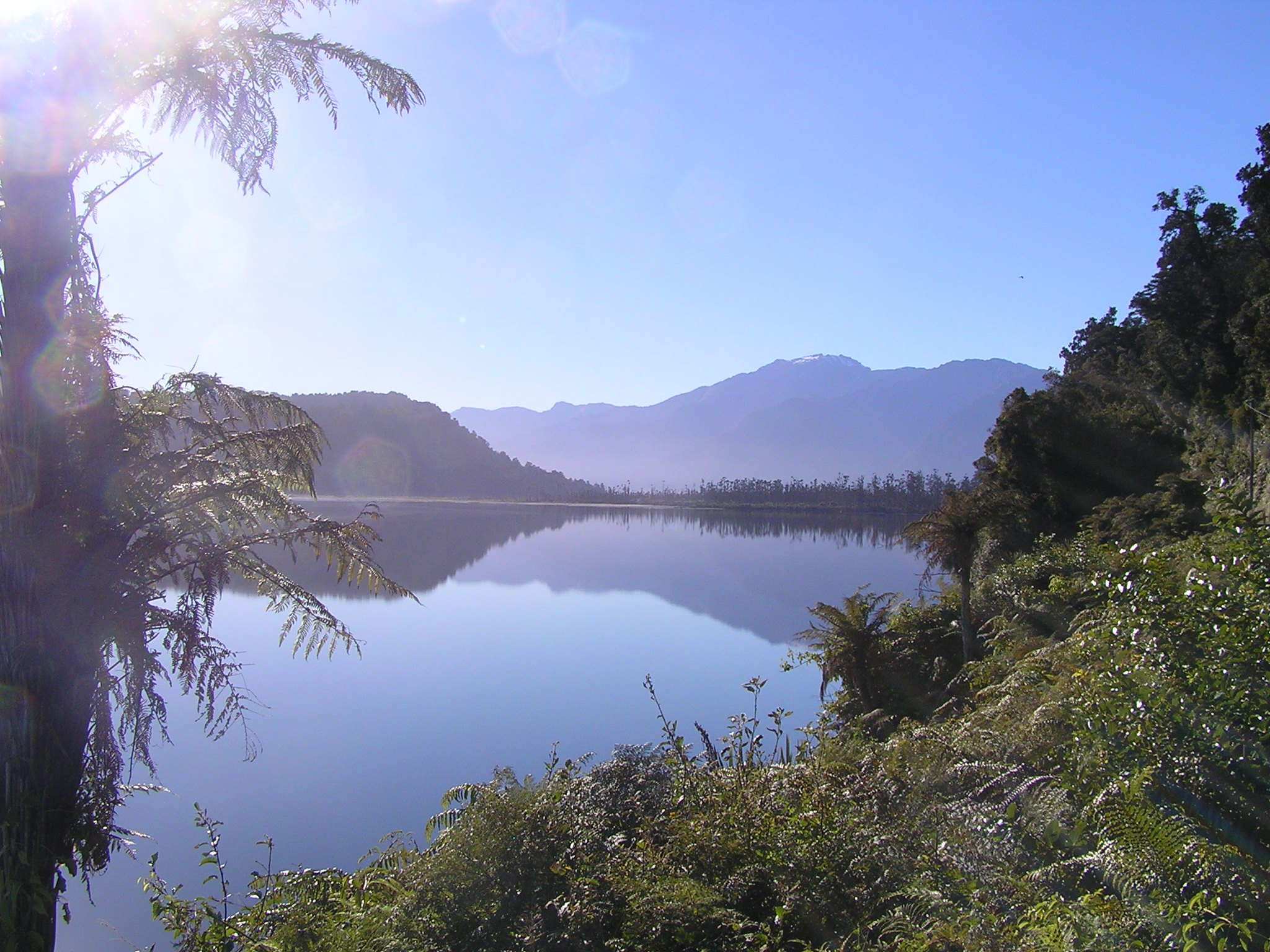

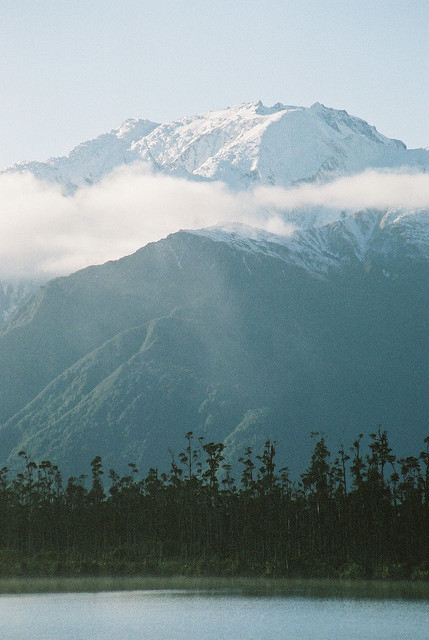

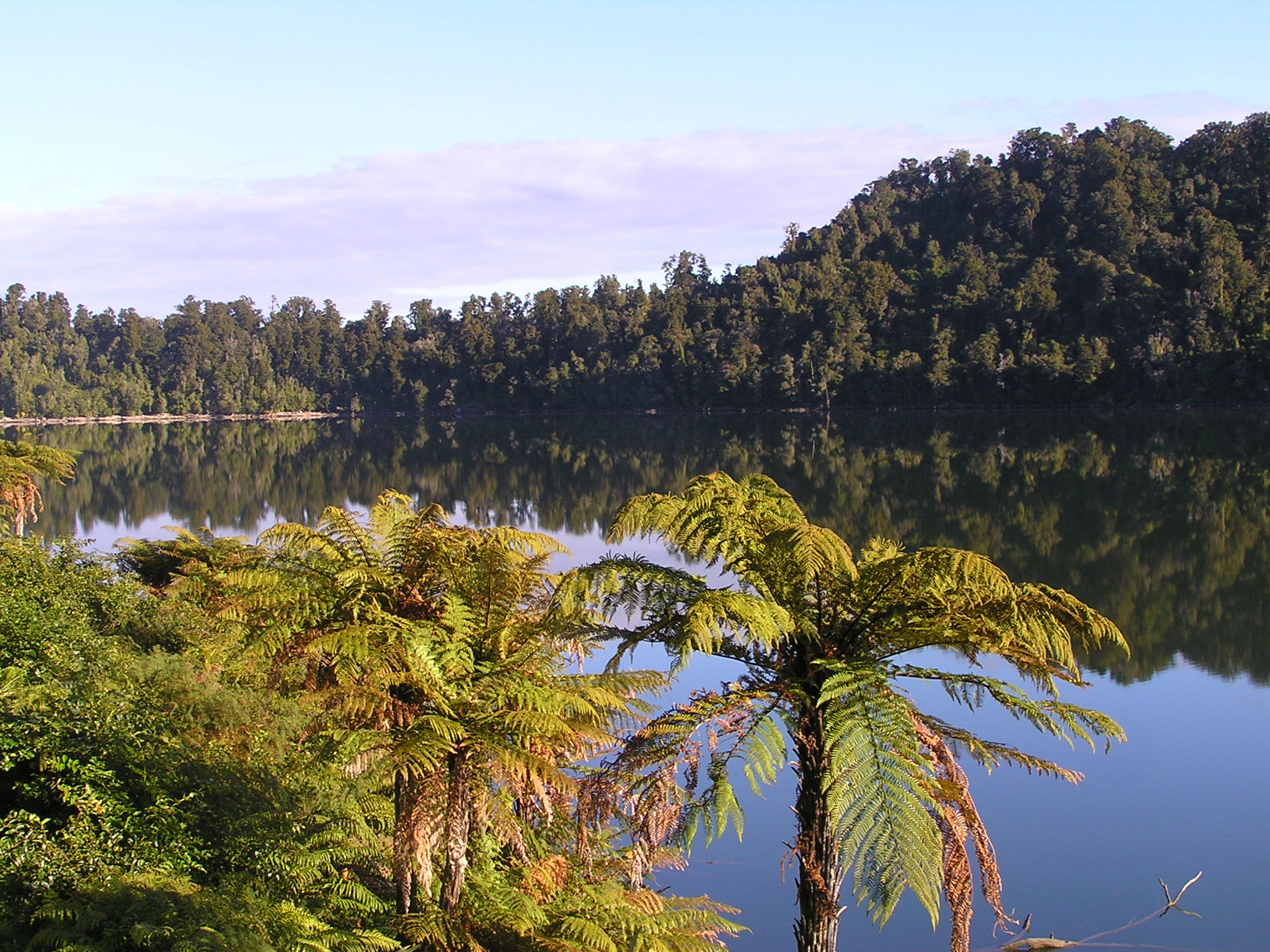

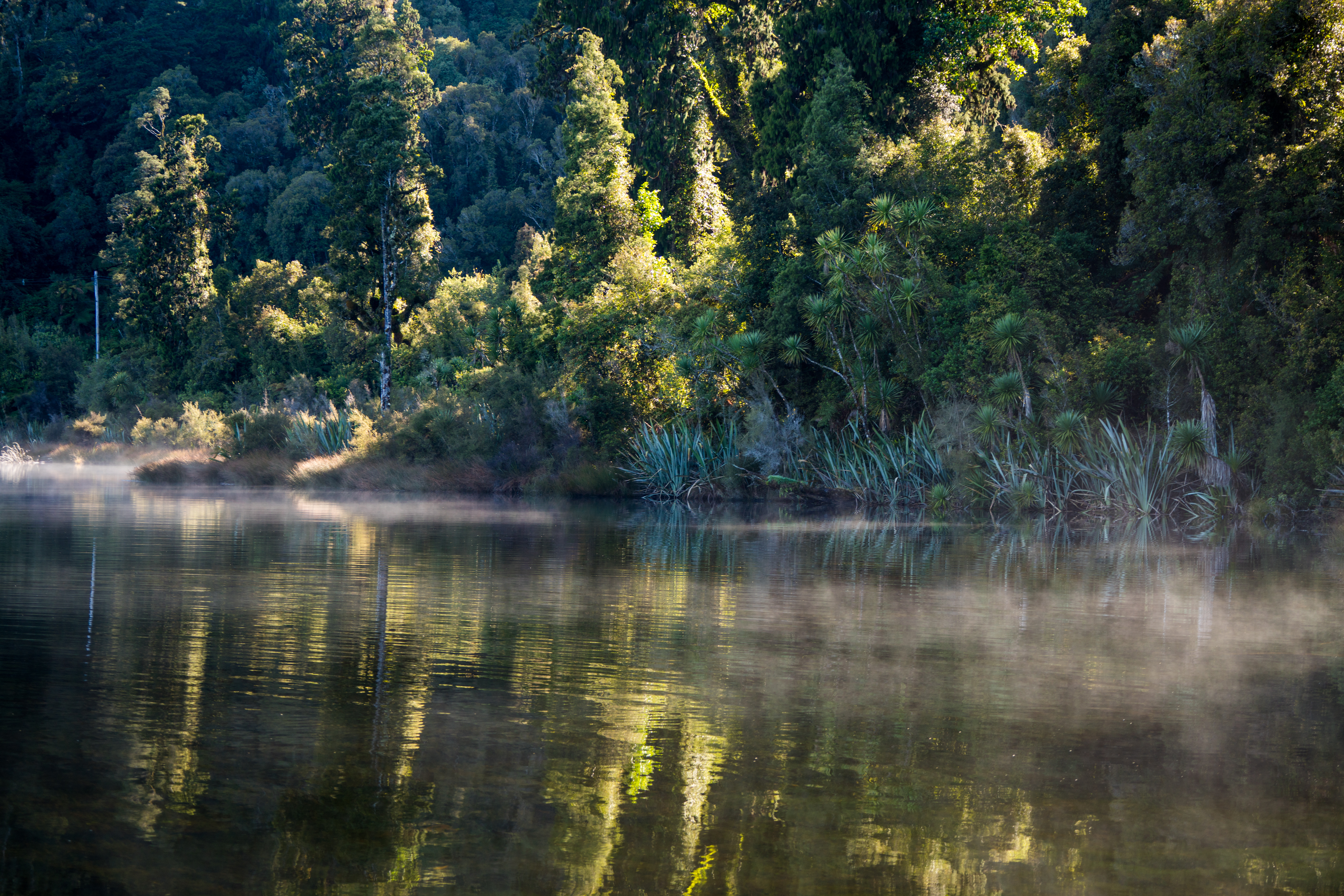

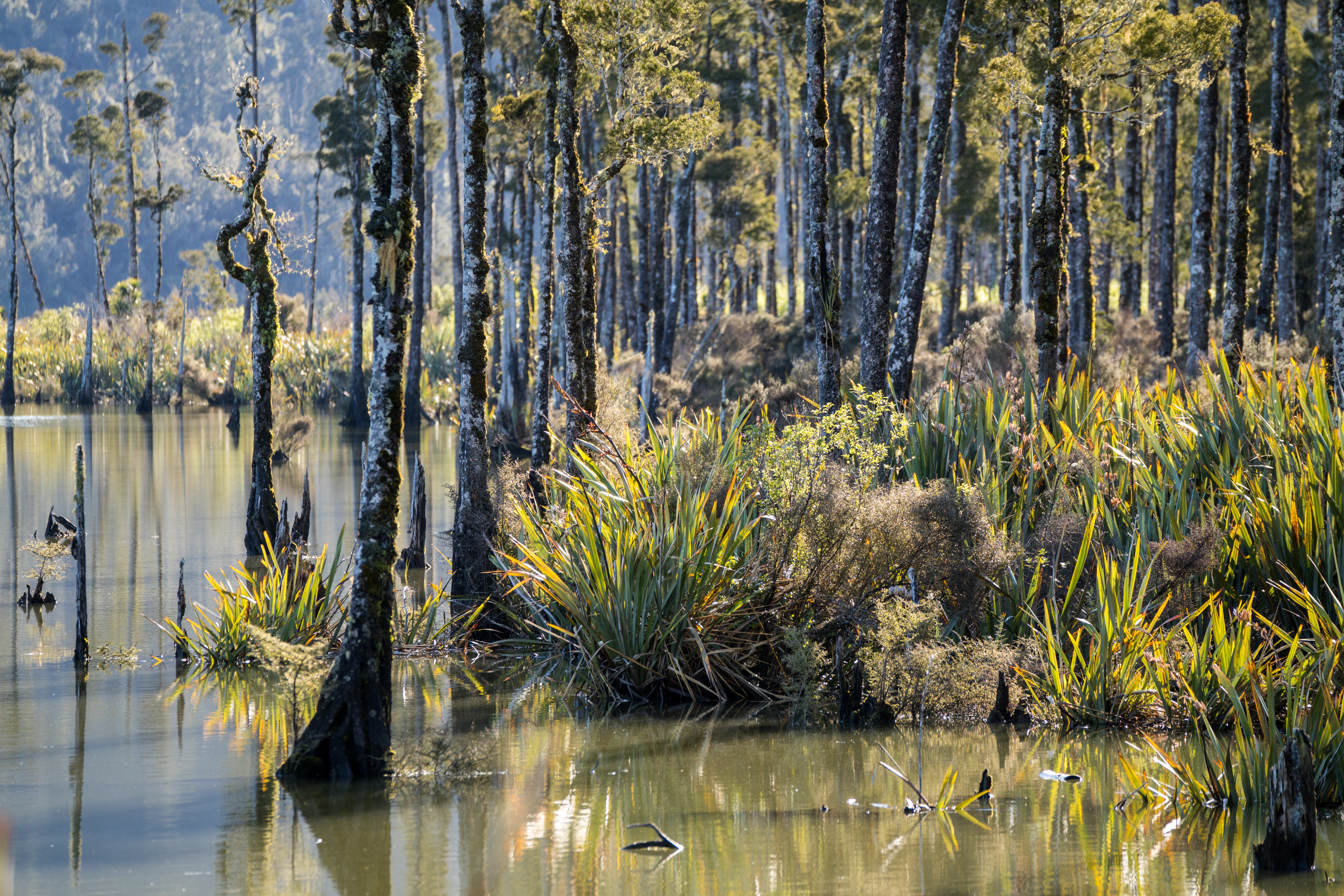
