= Ōkārito Lagoon =

Lagoon in New Zealand

- Okarito Lagoon
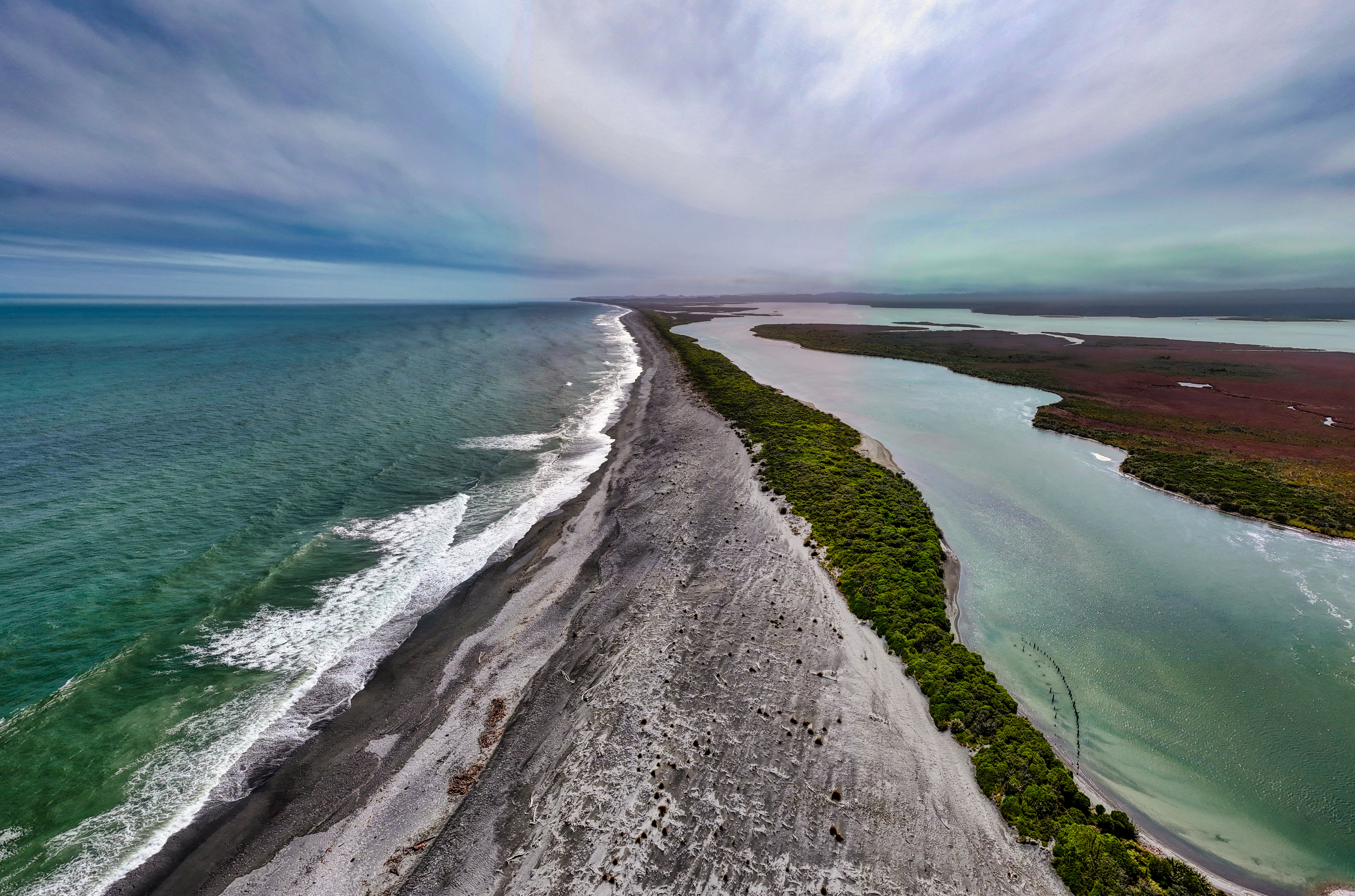
- Ōkārito Lagoon and the ocean

- Location within South Island Location within New Zealand
- Interactive map of Ōkārito Lagoon
- Location: Westland District, West Coast, New Zealand
- Coordinates: 43°12′S 170°13′E
- Type: lagoon
- Basin countries: New Zealand

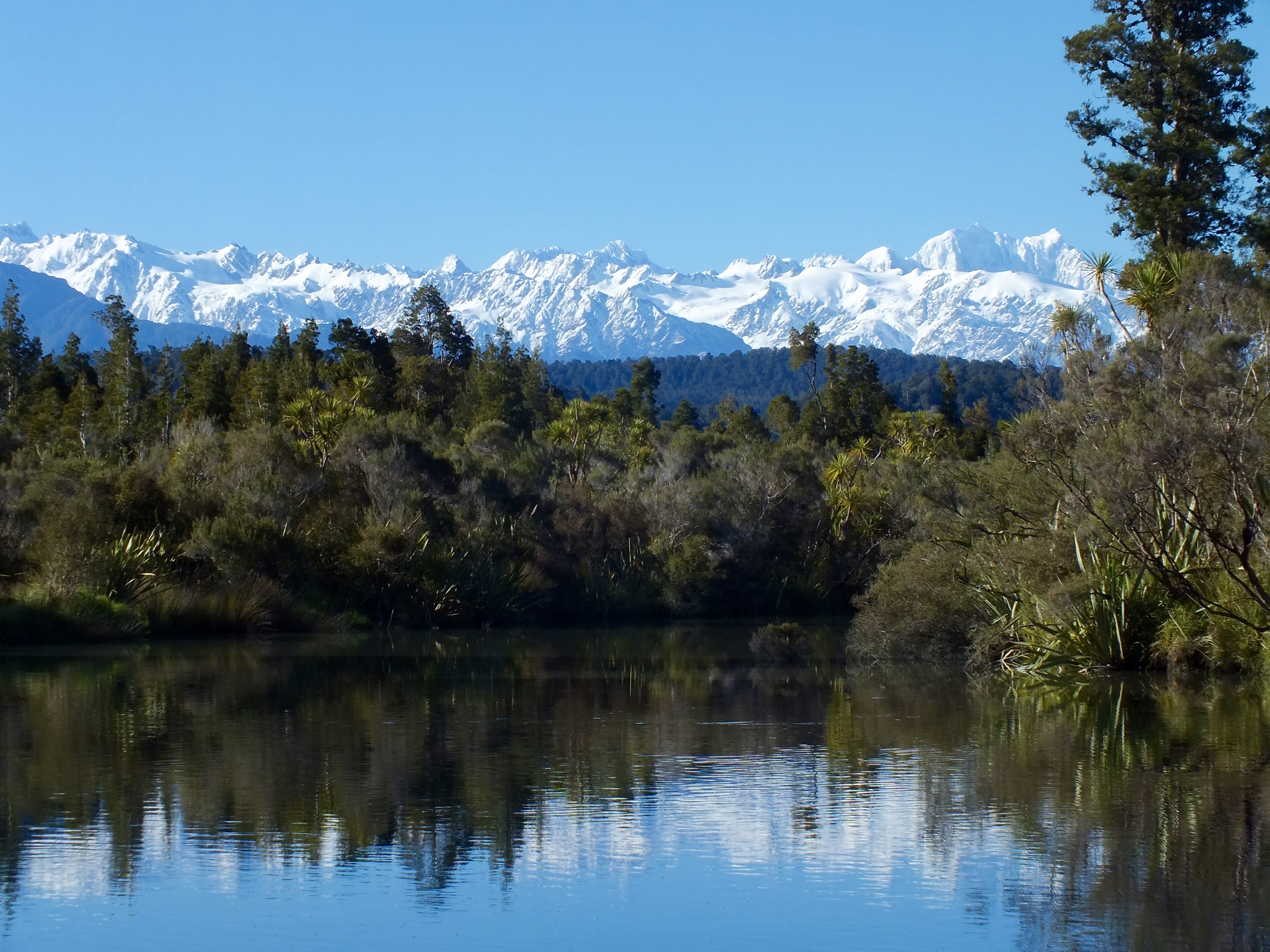
View across Ōkārito Lagoon

Ōkārito Lagoon is a coastal lagoon on the West Coast of New Zealand's South Island. It is located 130 kilometres (81 mi) south of Hokitika, and covers an area of about 3,240 hectares (12.5 sq mi), making it the largest unmodified coastal wetland in New Zealand. It preserves a sequence of vegetation types from mature rimu forest through mānuka scrub to brackish water that has been lost in much of the rest of the West Coast. The settlement of Ōkārito is at the southern end of the lagoon.

== Name ==
The lagoon's name is from the Māori Ō, place of, and kārito, the young shoots of the bulrush or raupō (Typha orientalis), a valued food source. Another account has Ōkārito taking its name from a rangatira named Kārito, whose daughters Mapourika and Wahapako gave their names to nearby Lake Mapourika and Lake Wahapo. The lagoon's official name has been spelled with macrons over the vowels since 2010, although it is still commonly seen written as "Okarito".

== Geography ==
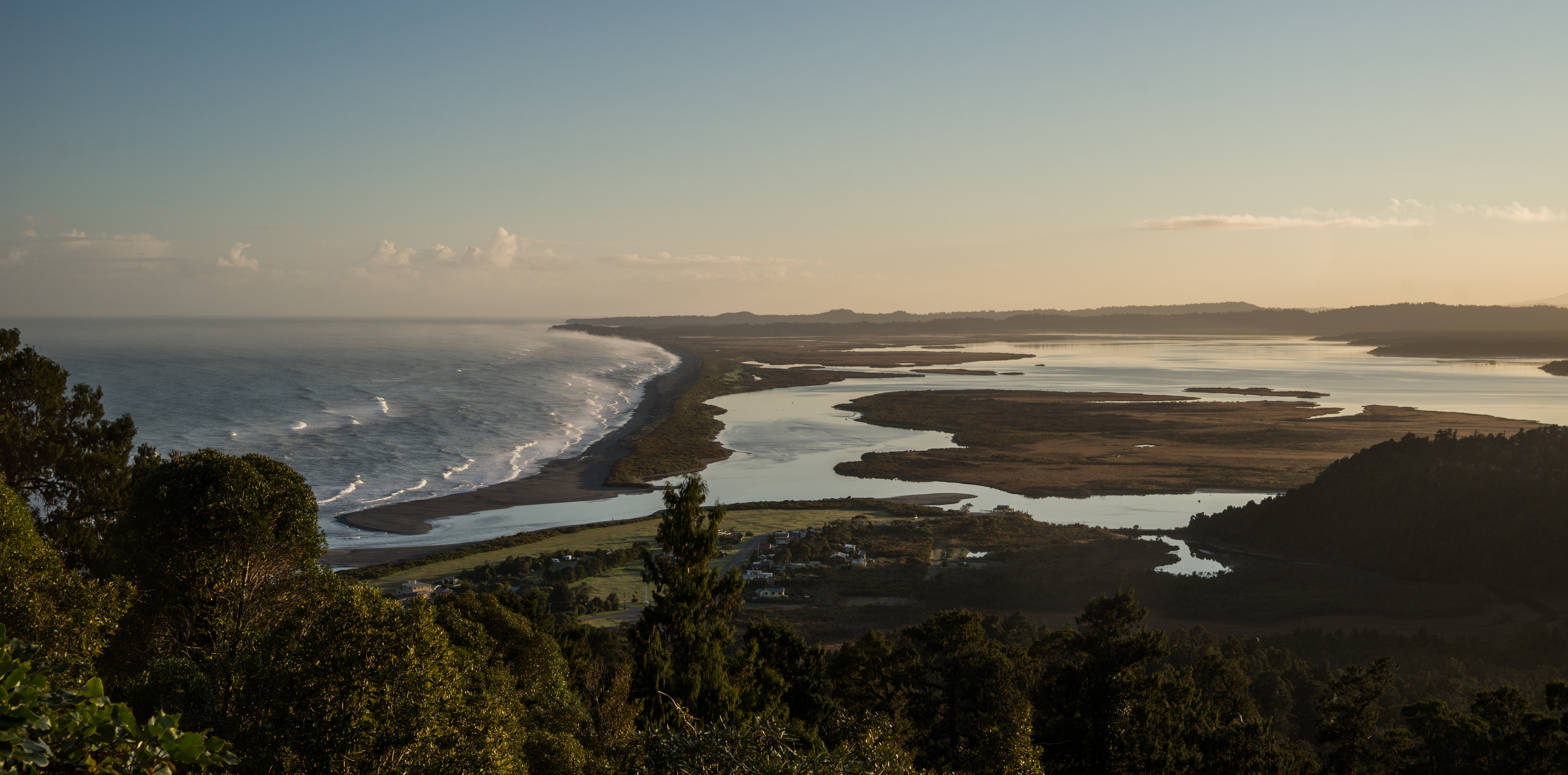
The lagoon from the south, on Ōkārito Trig

The lagoon is 3,240 hectares (8,000 acres) in area, mostly quite shallow. It is the largest sandbar-built estuarine wetland in the West Coast region – and the largest such unmodified wetland in all New Zealand – and is roughly in the middle of a series of wetlands that extends for 40 km, between the Wanganui River in the north and the Waiho River in the south. Around the lagoon is a low moraine ridge left by a glacier 18,000 years ago as it retreated up what is now the Whataroa River.

Several small waterways drain into the lagoon, and it is the outflow of Lake Mapourika and Lake Wahapo via the Ōkārito River. At the southern end of the lagoon is the small settlement of Ōkārito. The lagoon is tidal, with large stretches of mudflat being exposed at low tide, when reliable passage for canoes is only possible along a main channel. The channel forks into several streams and creeks that can be used to enter tall coastal kahikatea and rimu rainforest. Most of the lagoon is trackless and muddy and only accessible by boat.

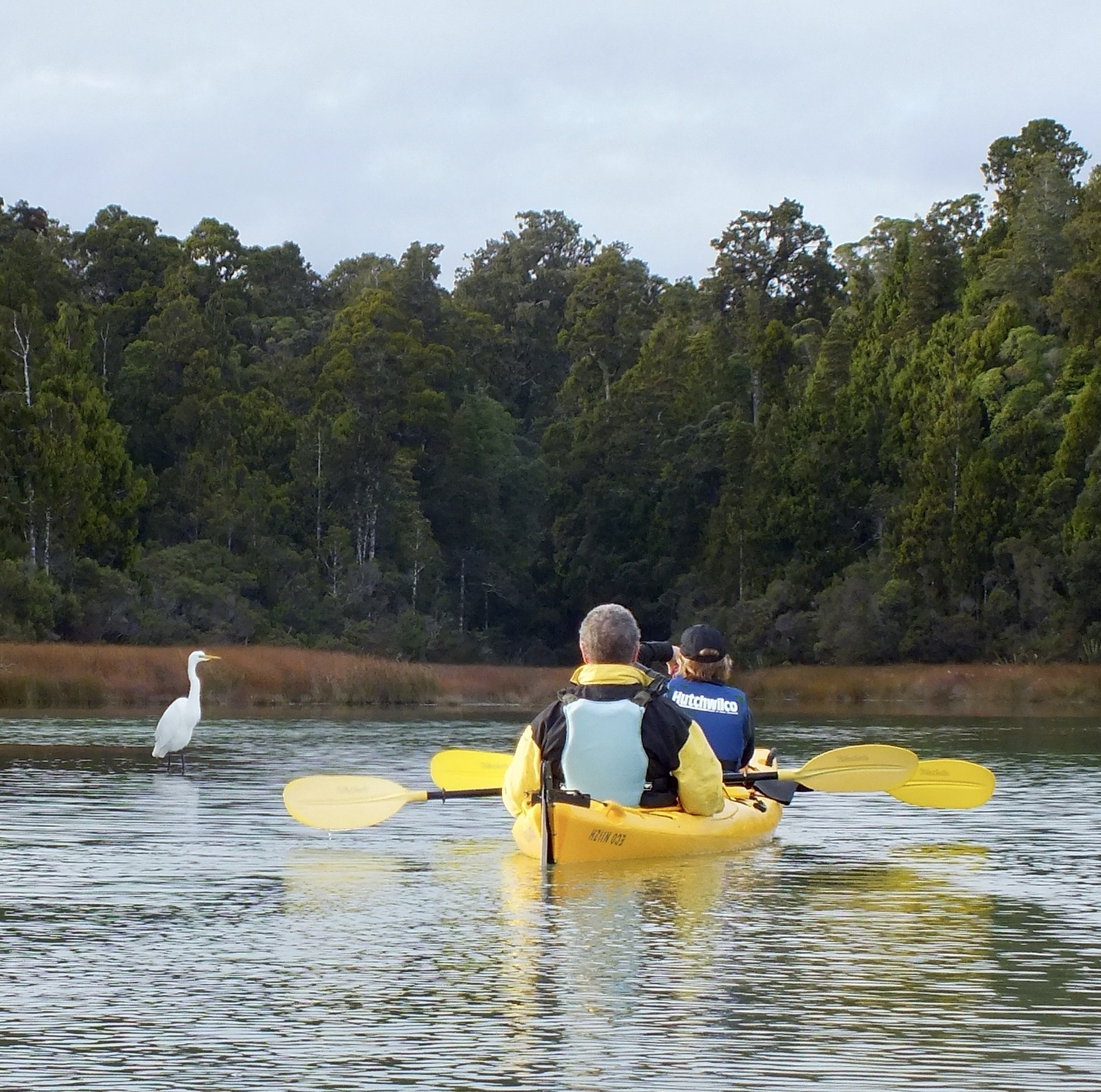
Kayaking in the lagoon

The lagoon is a dynamic system, driven by seismic activity along the main Alpine Fault. In an earthquake, the estuary floor settles and deepens, but sediment from landslides is also washed down from the mountains, forming a spit which partly blocks the lagoon off from the sea and raises the shoreline. Tides cannot penetrate as far, and a freshwater ecosystem forms, dominated by raupō around the water's edge. Sediment is deposited at the river's mouth as a delta. Over time, the arrival of sediment slows, the spit is breached and washed away, the water level lowers, and tides come further inland forming a brackish water ecosystem. During this stage Ōkārito's rimu forest is able to encroach around the edges of the now-lower lagoon, a pattern we can observe today.

== Flora ==
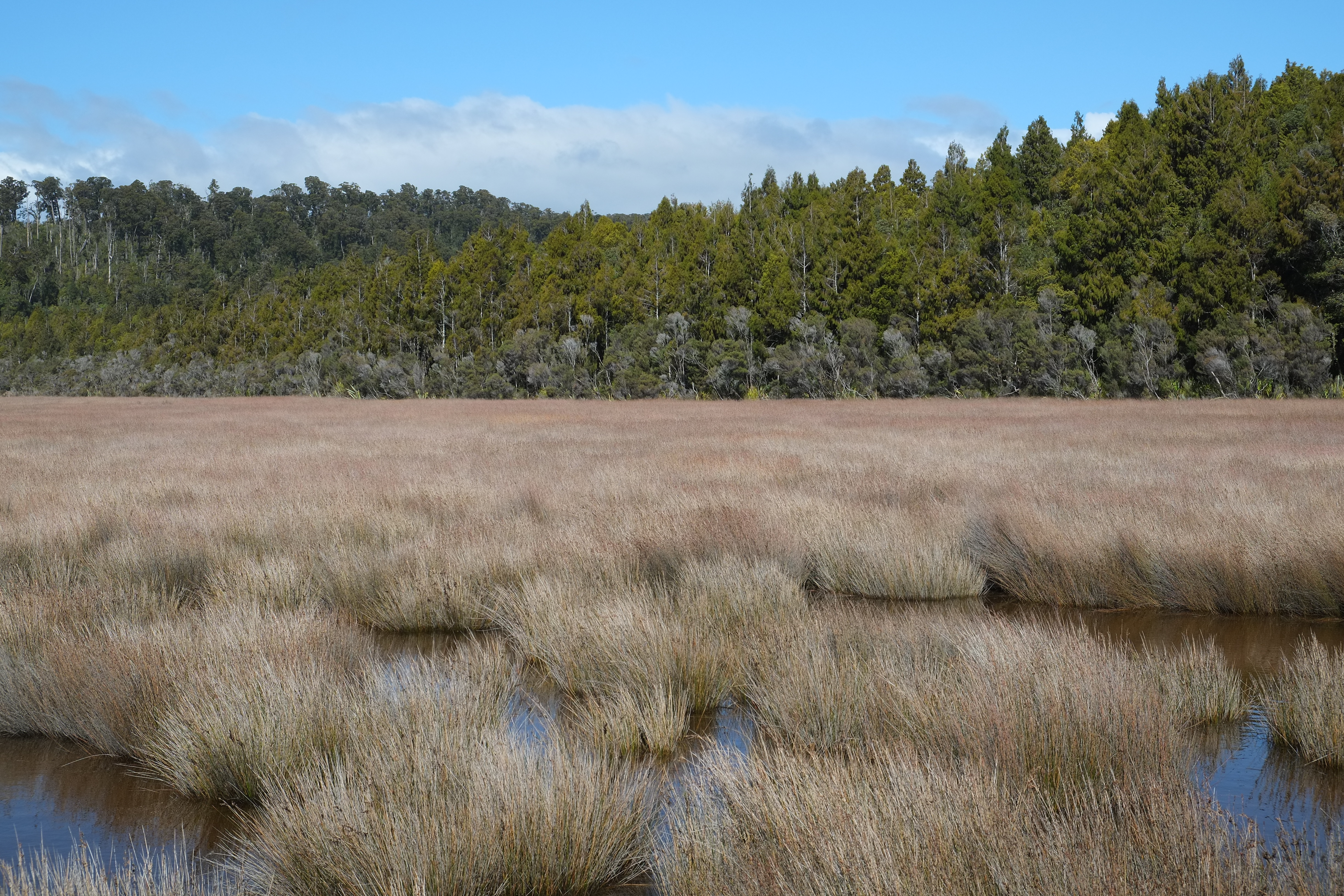
Oioi meadow at the Ōkārito Wetland Walk; the transition zone of mānuka scrub to forest can be clearly seen

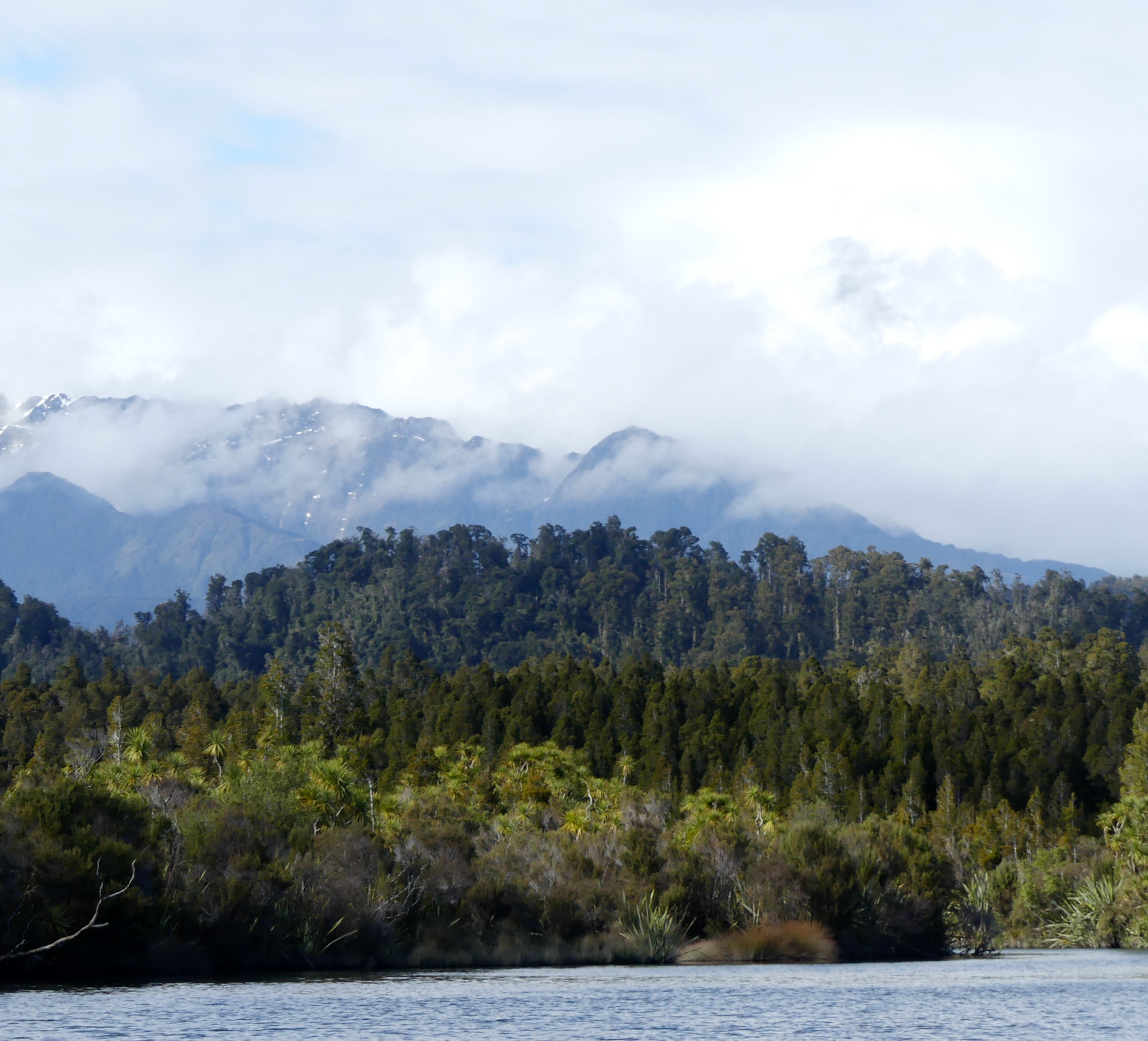
The transition from scrub with emergent cabbage trees through kahikatea forest to mature rimu forest

Ōkārito Lagoon has extensive meadows of eelgrass (Zostera muelleri), one of the few such estuaries remaining in New Zealand; most have been wiped out by pollution and sedimentation after forest clearance. Eelgrass is not a seaweed, but a flowering plant that is pollinated underwater. Eelgrass beds are highly productive, not only drawing nutrients up out of the mud but providing a rich habitat for invertebrates and a nursery for baby fishes.

On the inland side of the lagoon are large stretches of saltmarsh and swampland, dominated by jointed wire rush or oioi (Apodasmia similis). This becomes a band of mānuka (Leptospermum scoparium), mingimingi (Coprosma propinqua), and flax (Phormium tenax) shrubland that transitions through kahikatea swamp forest into bush dominated by rimu and silver pine (Manoao colensoi). Ōkārito is one of the few places on the West Coast where the transition of tall rain forest through scrub and rush to brackish water can still be easily observed.

The transition zone can stretch quite a distance and contain saltmarsh ribbonwood (Plagianthus divaricatus), cabbage trees (Cordyline australis), and invasive gorse (Ulex europaeus), gradually incorporating kahihatea, southern rātā, and kōwhai (Sophora microphylla) as salinity declines; or it can take place over just a few metres on the bank of a creek.

== Fauna ==
Over 70 bird species have been reported from Ōkārito Lagoon and the surrounding forest, including 40 species of shorebirds and migratory waders. Paradise shelducks, New Zealand scaup, black swans, and occasional grey ducks can be seen on the water. Black shags (Phalacrocorax carbo), little shags (P. melanoleucos), pied shags (P. varius), and spotted shags (Stictocarbo punctatus) all occur in the lagoon. Caspian terns (Hydroprogne caspia) and white-fronted terns (Sterna striata) are present, and most of the gulls are black-billed gulls (Chroicocephalus bulleri), the world's most threatened gull species. As well as the common white-faced heron, one can see royal spoonbills and the famed white heron or kōtuku (Ardea alba modesta). Banded dotterels and variable oystercatchers breed on Ōkārito Beach.

Fernbirds are present all around the lagoon, and perhaps the best place in the world to see this secretive bird is amongst the oioi rushes on the Ōkārito Wetland Walk – this vegetation is not as good a hiding place as their usual scrub habitat. Pairs can be heard making a call-and-response u-tick call. Australasian bitterns and marsh crakes also inhabit the wetlands but are far harder to spot.

The juvenile fishes known as whitebait are common here, and so are whitebaiters during the September–mid-November season. The lagoon also contains longfin eels, flounder and yellow-eyed mullet. The mudflats are home to tunnelling crabs / papaka (Helice crassa), mudsnails / titiko (Amphibola crenata), and mudflat topshells (Diloma subrostratum). Flounder and shellfish populations are currently in good health.

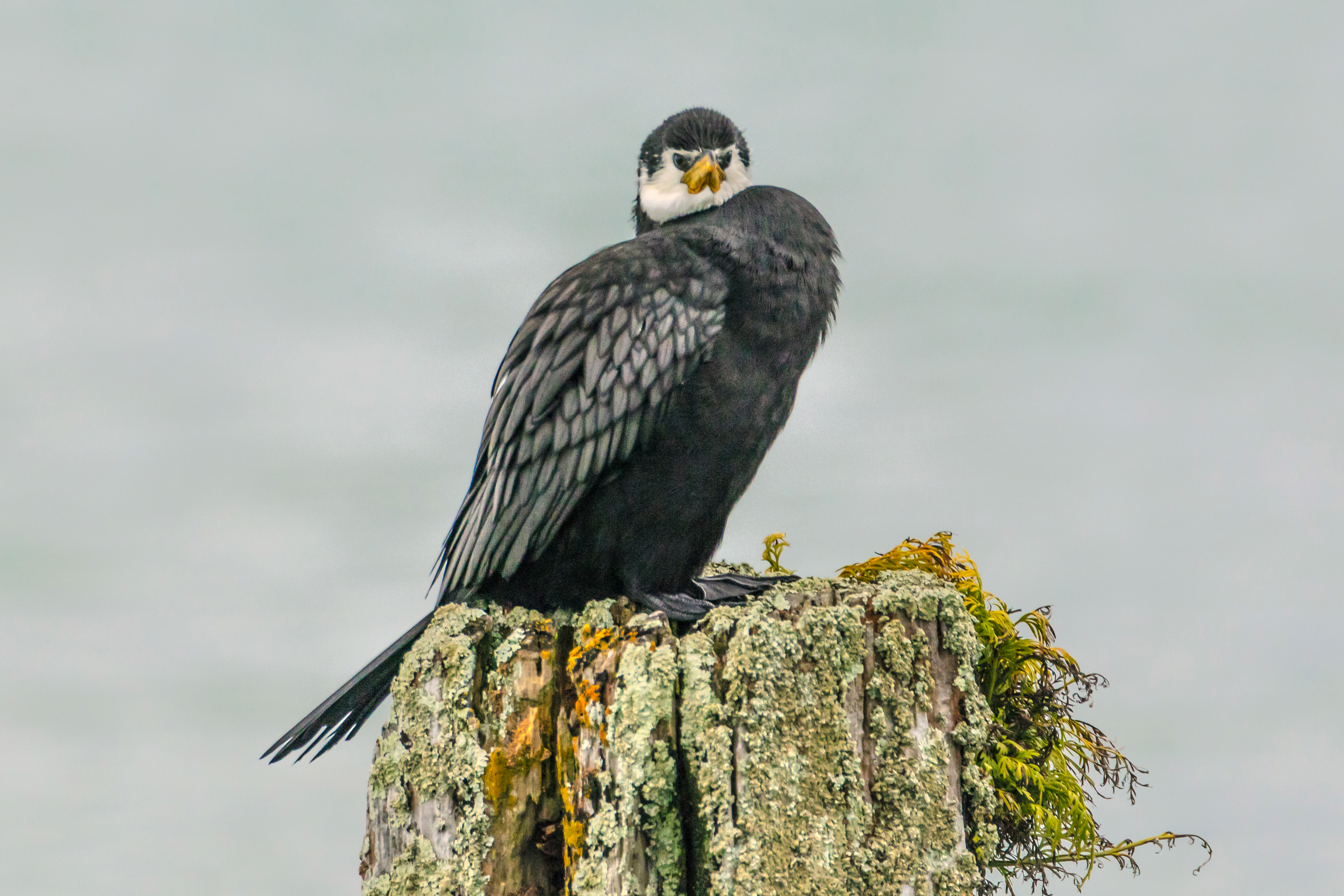
Little shag

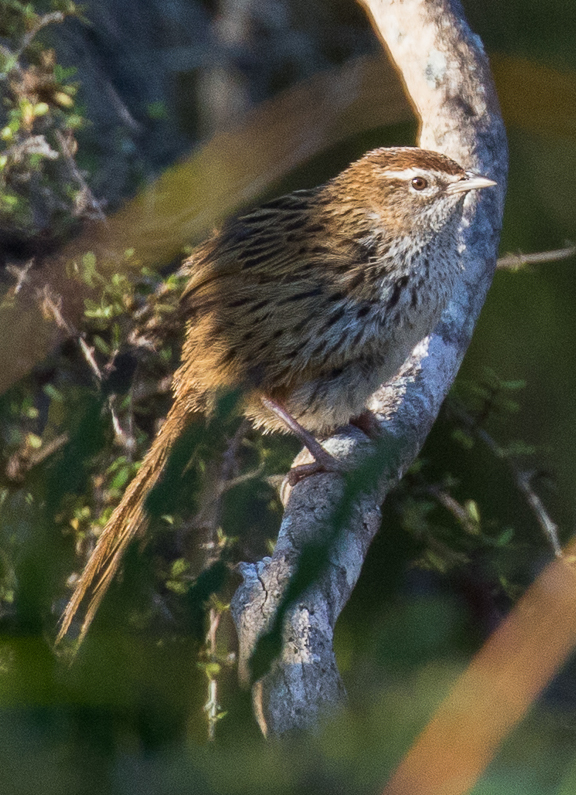
Fernbird

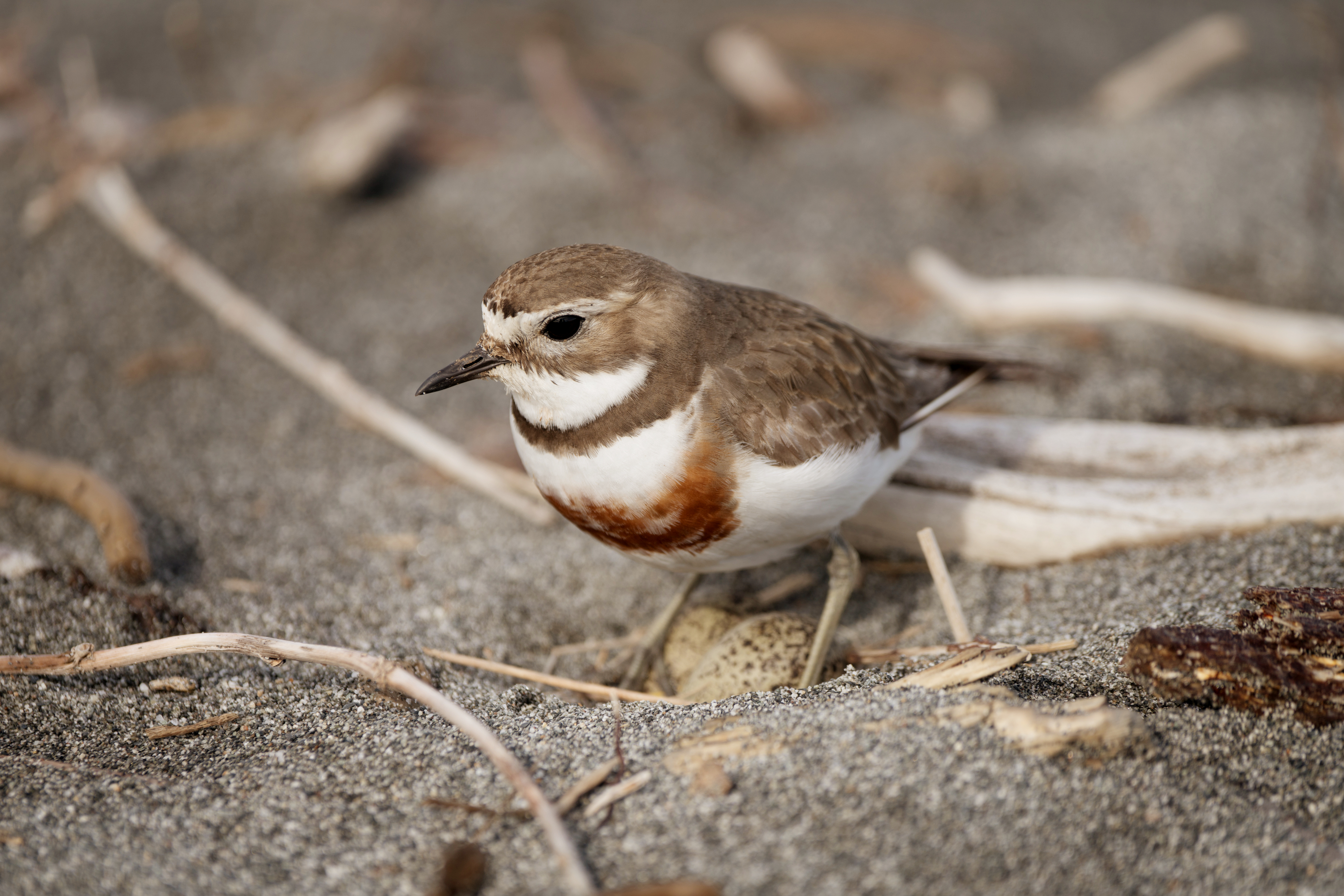
Banded dotterel

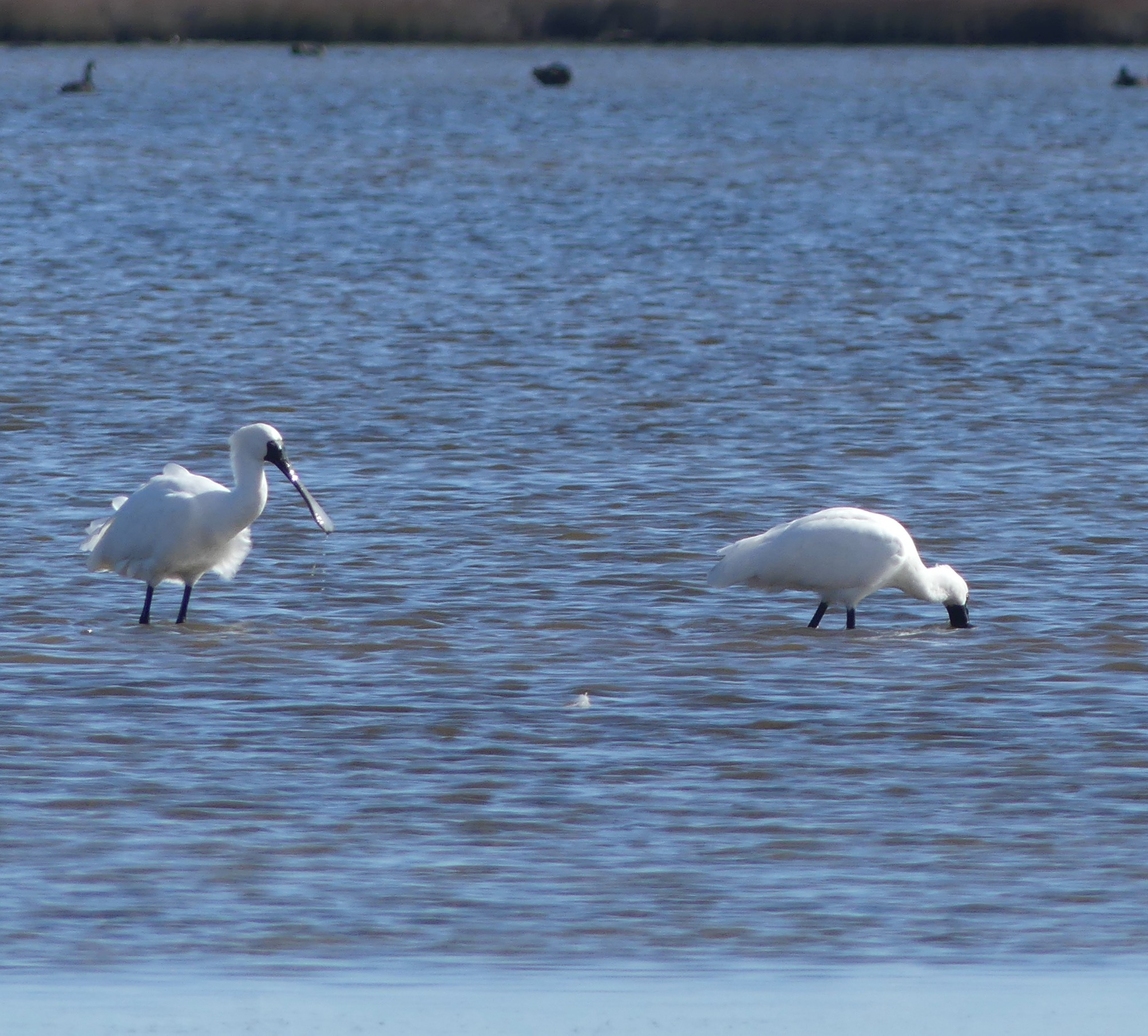
Royal spoonbills

=== Kōtuku ===
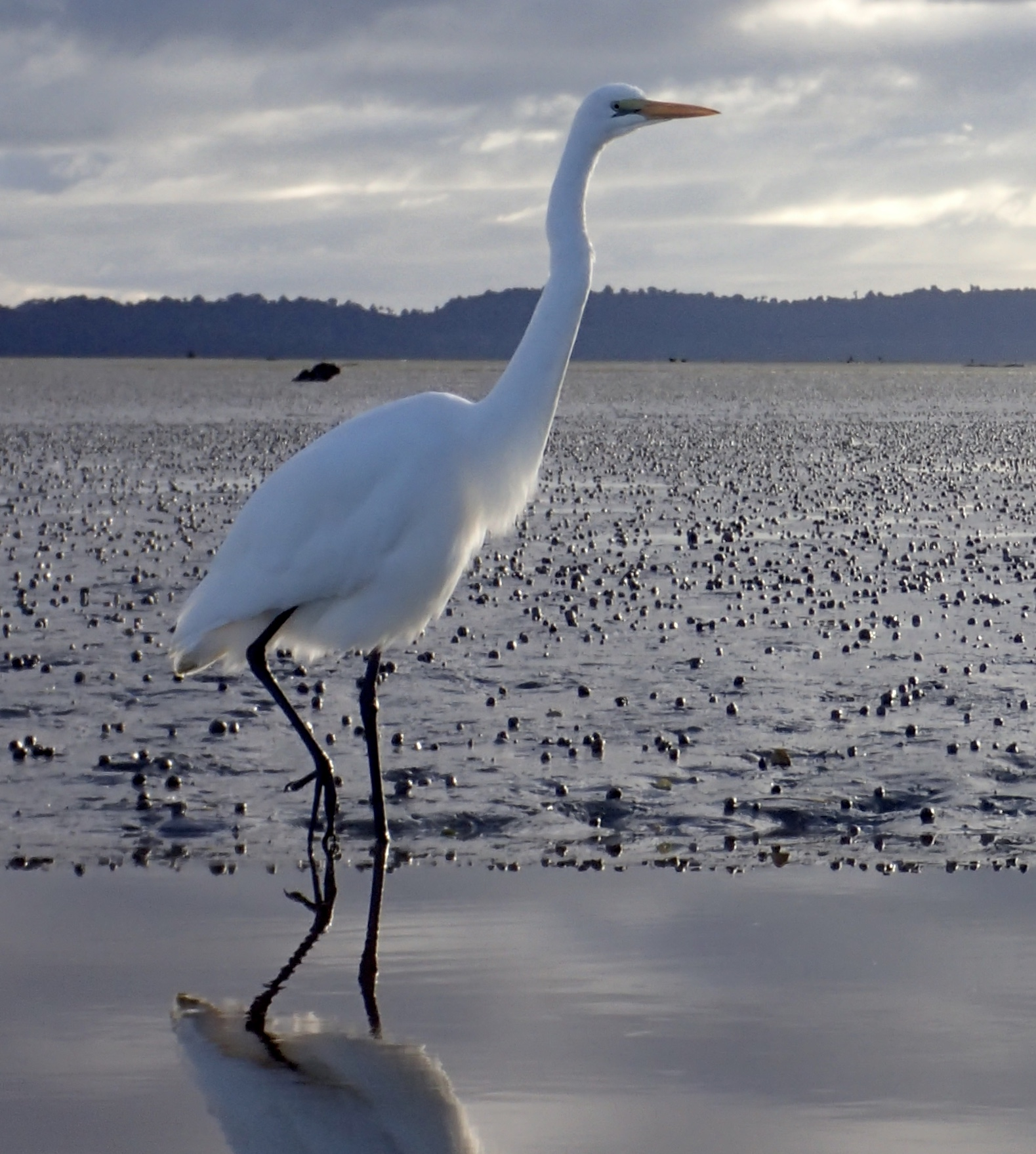
Kōtuku at Ōkārito Lagoon

For many New Zealanders, Ōkārito is synonymous with the white heron (Ardea alba modesta), commonly referred to by its Māori name kōtuku, and known outside New Zealand as the Eastern great egret. This subspecies of great egret is quite common throughout Asia and Australia, but in New Zealand the white heron is extremely rare. When Queen Elizabeth II visited New Zealand in 1953–54, she was compared to the kōtuku – a compliment given to rare, distinguished visitors. The kōtuku is featured on the reverse side of a New Zealand $2 coin.

There is only one breeding site for White Heron in New Zealand: within the protected Waitangiroto Nature Reserve, north of Ōkārito Lagoon. Kōtuku share the colony with royal spoonbills, known as kōtuku ngutupapa. From this colony, kōtuku disperse throughout New Zealand, but return to this spot to breed. The first European to see the colony was surveyor Gerhard Mueller, who was guided there by Kere Tūtoko in 1865. There were only four nesting pairs of kōtuku in 1941 when the land at Waitangiroto was compulsorily acquired by the New Zealand government and gazetted as a nature reserve. The New Zealand population of kōtuku is around 180.

About 8–10 white herons are resident year-round at the Ōkārito Lagoon, and are most common seen between October and March. They can be observed relatively close up while kayaking on the lagoon, and regular birdwatching tours visit the colony from Whataroa.

== History ==
Māori occupation and seasonal harvesting in the area began over 600 years ago. Ōkārito was an important mahinga kai (food-gathering site) for Kāti Māhaki ki Makaawhio, a subtribe of Ngāi Tahu, who were collecting and working pounamu for trade. As part of the 1998 Ngāi Tahu Claims Settlement Act, Ngāi Tahu were granted a nohoanga (seasonal gathering site) at the lagoon and statutory acknowledgment of their rights over it.

In the West Coast gold rush of the 1860s, Ōkārito rapidly grew to a population of several thousand, with 31 hotels, three banks, and a courthouse. The port was the third busiest on the West Coast after Hokitika and Greymouth, and had a wharf, customs house, and harbourmaster. At one point 500 prospective gold miners arrived in a single day. The harbourmaster directed ships over the treacherous bar with flags and signals. Flax and timber were exported from the wharf in the late 19th and early 20th century. Part of the wharf and its shed survive today; the shed was heavily reconstructed in 1960 using parts of the original wharf and shed, and now functions as an information centre.

Ōkārito Wharf

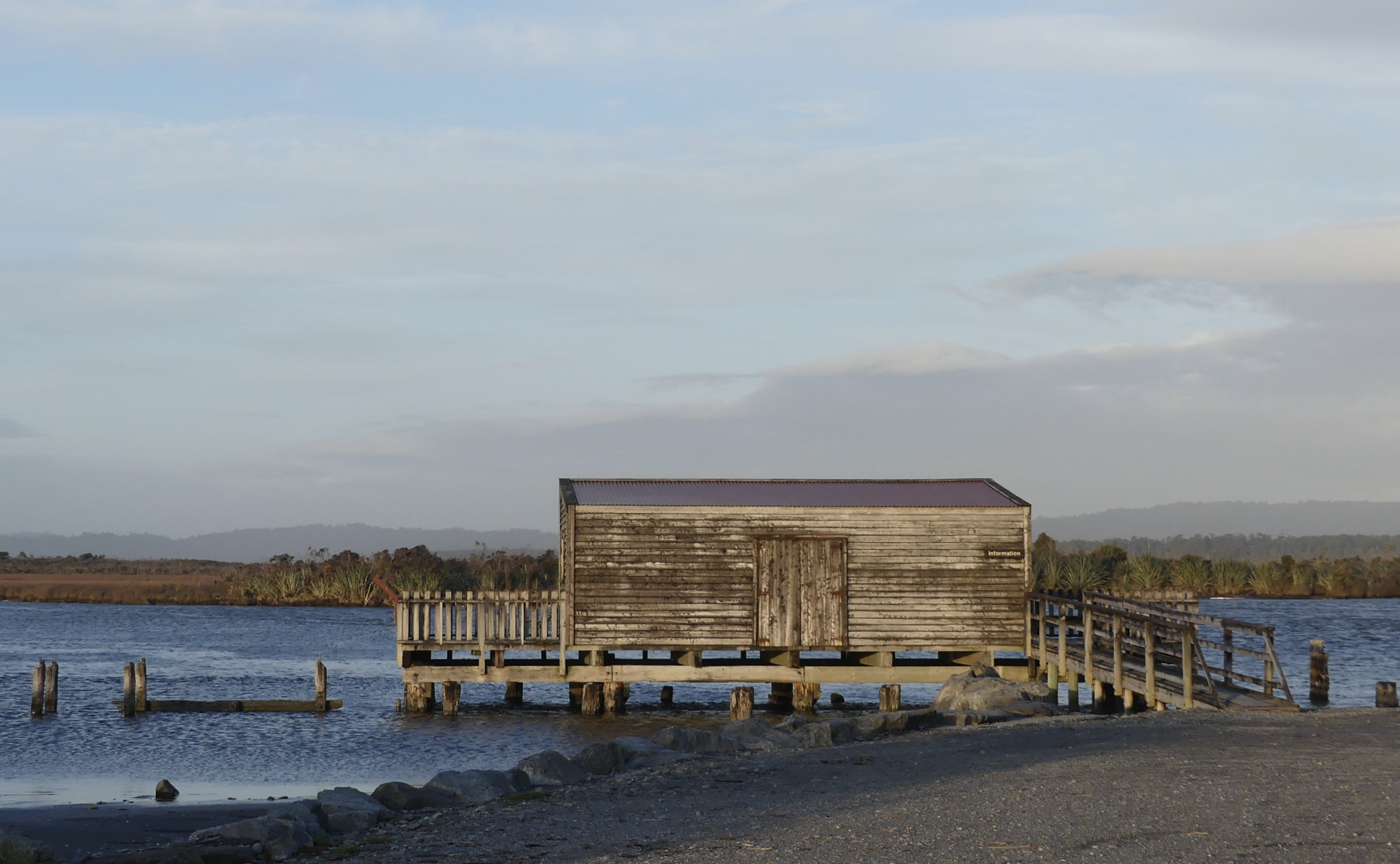

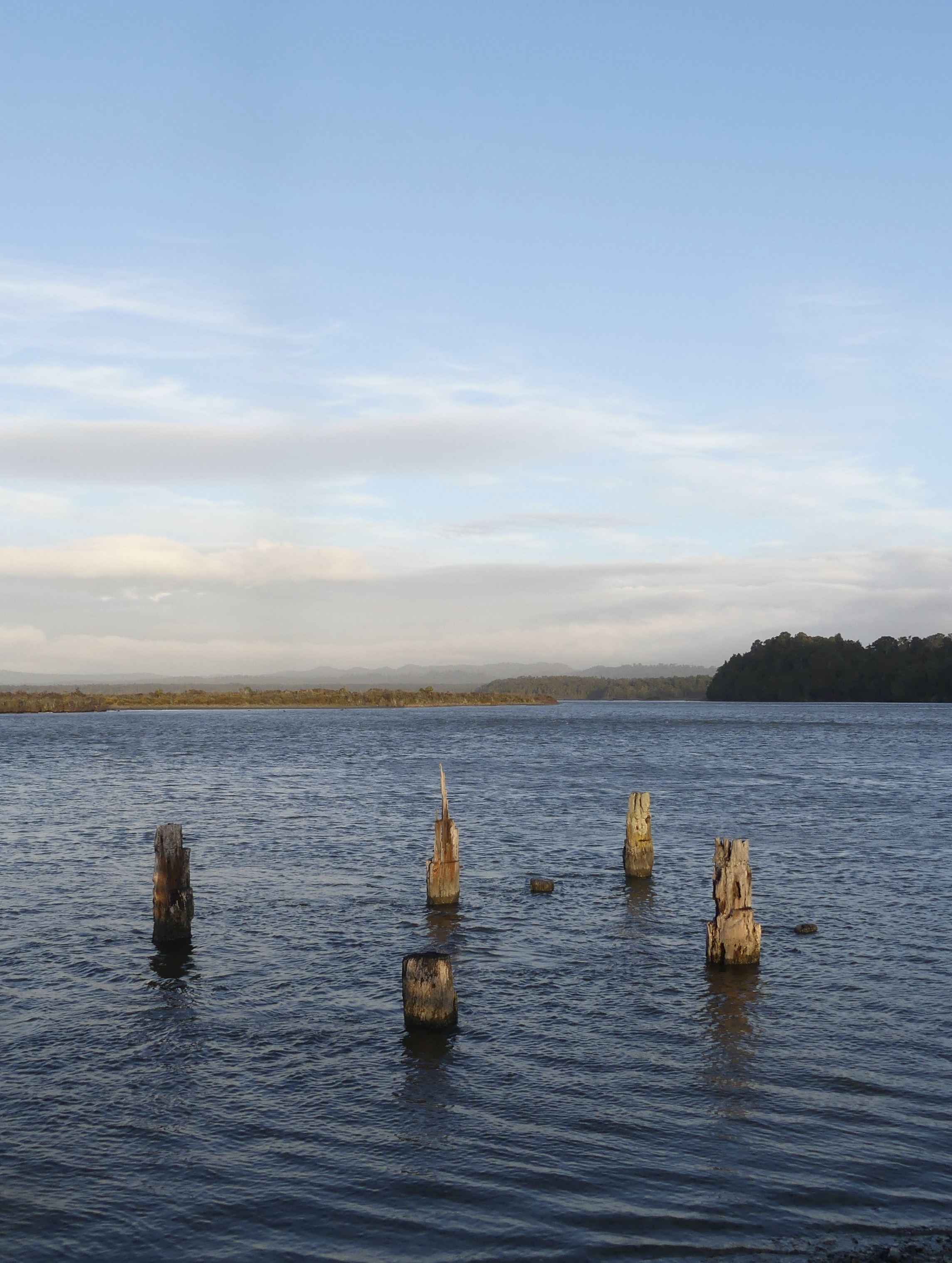

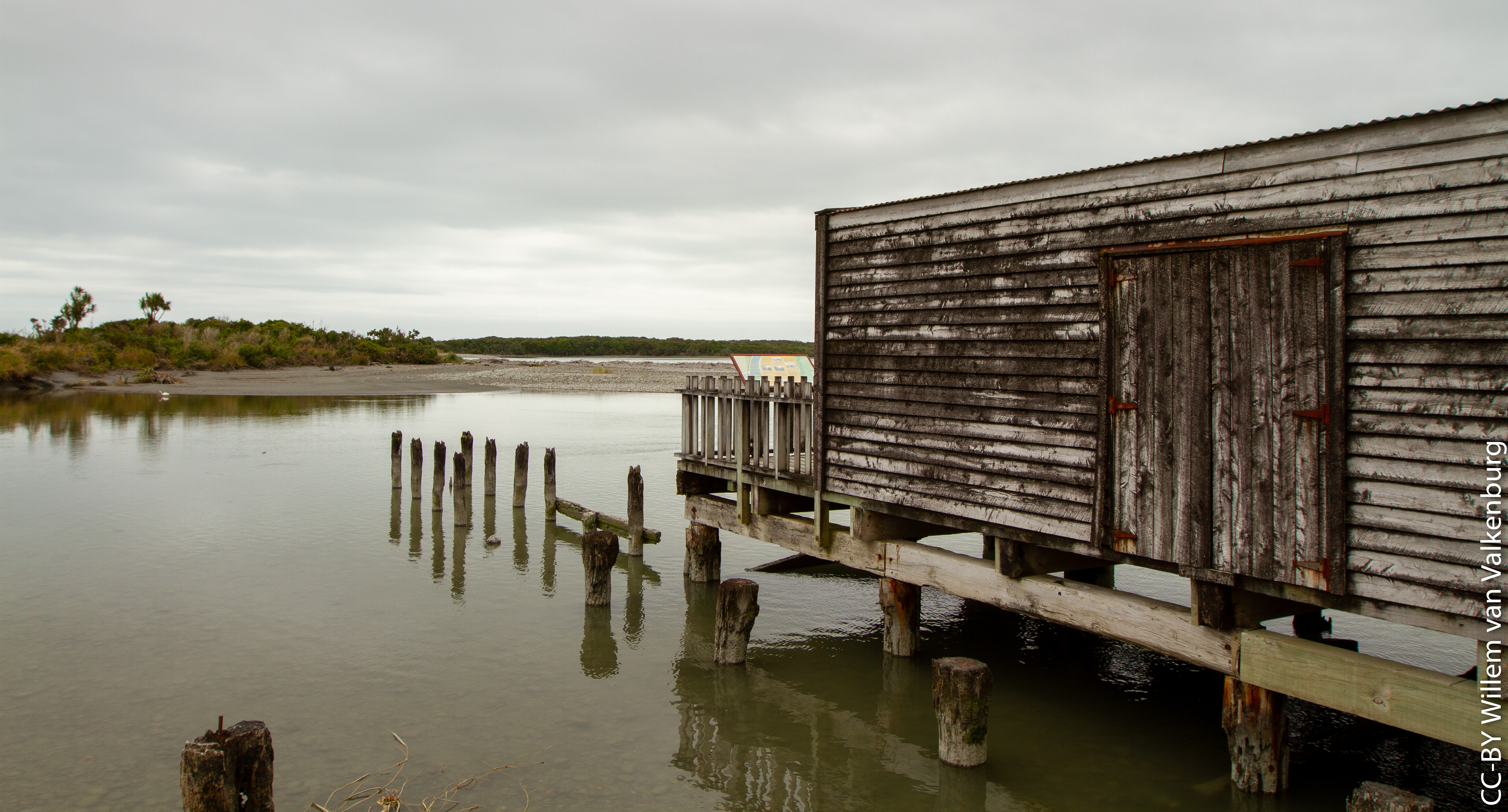

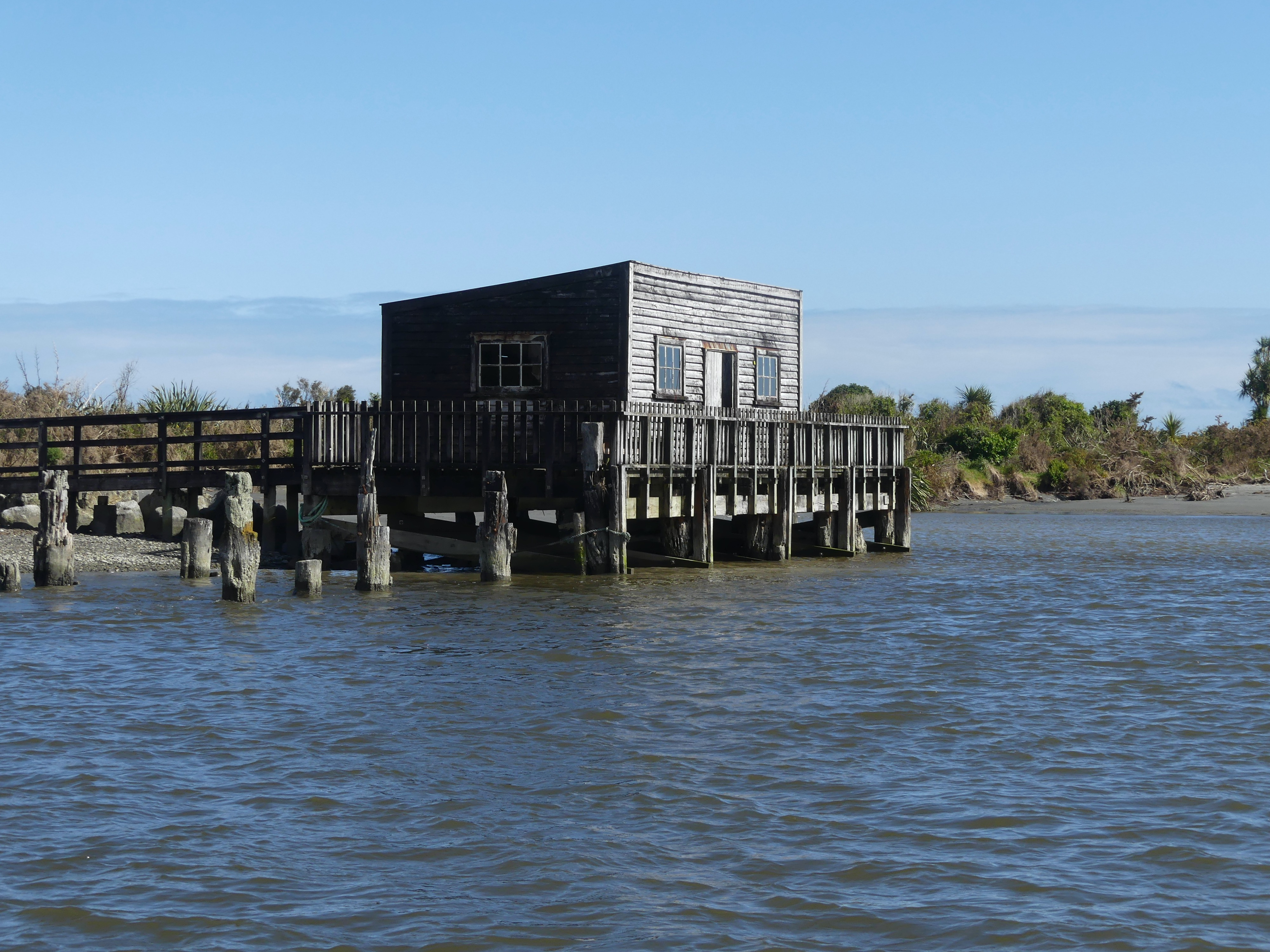

A large island in the lagoon was once the venue for sports days and horse racing, and also the site of Ōkārito's first cemetery. One resident recalled:

…the annual racing carnival was held on the island, and we children climbed on the gravestones to watch the race as it circled the hill and thundered down the straight for home and the winning post… on the evening of the racing carnival, a race ball was held and everyone from near and far attended.

== Conservation ==
Although it is New Zealand's largest unmodified wetland, Ōkārito Lagoon is not yet protected under the Ramsar Convention on Wetlands, although several proposals have been made (the last in 2017). The lagoon has been made a mātaiti reserve with the support of local Makaawhio Māori, which allows for customary and recreational food gathering but not commercial harvesting. The area between Ōkārito Lagoon and the mountains is targeted by the $45 million Predator Free South Westland project, which aims to remove rats, stoats, and possums from 100,000 hectares.
