= Donovan's Store =

Historic building in Ōkārito, New Zealand

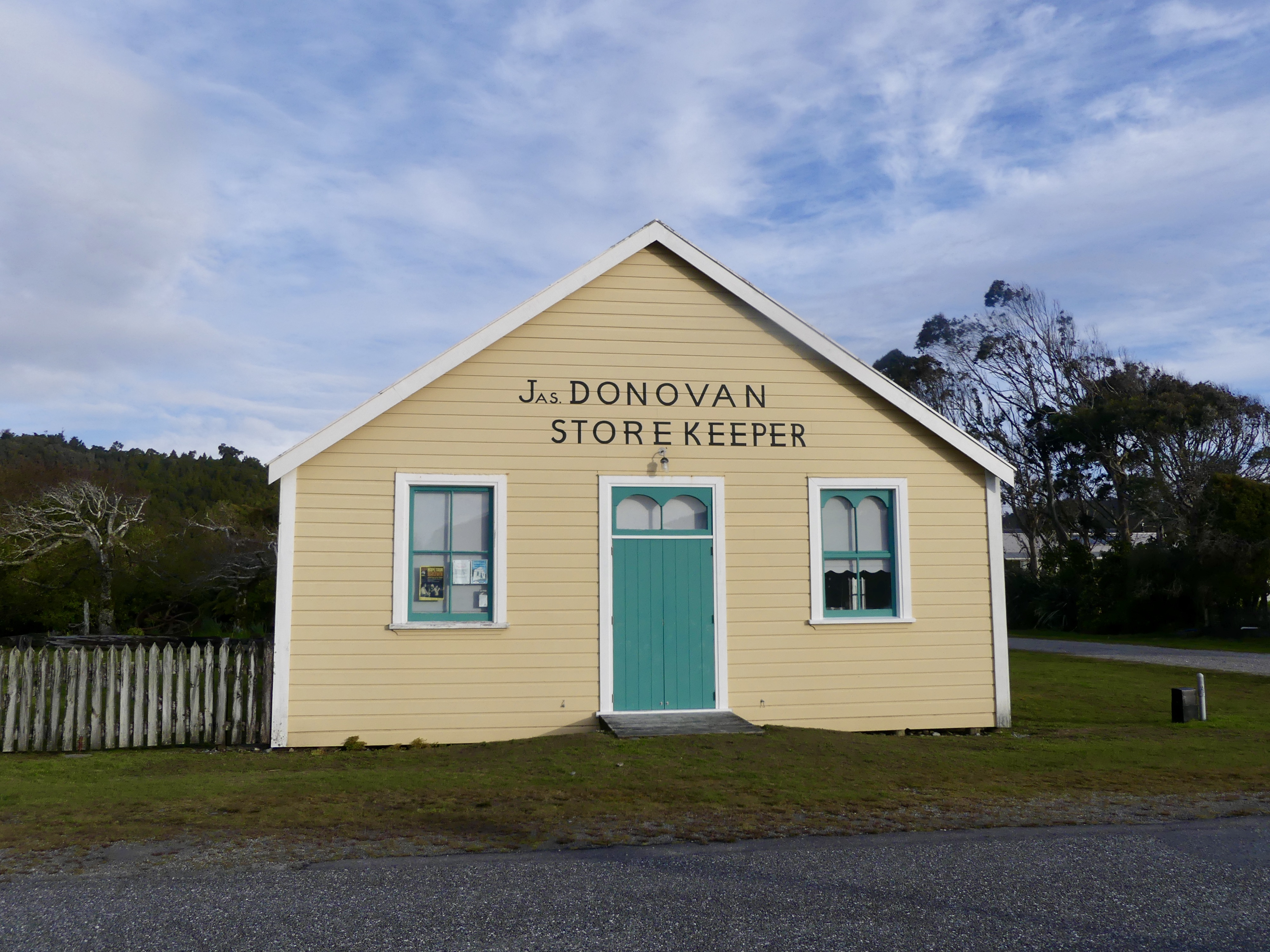
- Donovan's Store in 2020

General information
- Type: Commercial
- Address: 17 The Strand
- Town or city: Ōkārito
- Country: New Zealand
- Coordinates: 43°13′20.12″S 170°9′53.95″E
- Opened: c. 1866

Technical details
- Material: Timber, corrugated iron

Heritage New Zealand – Category 1
- Designated: 28 June 1990
- Reference no.: 5008

Donovan's Store at Ōkārito on the West Coast of New Zealand is the oldest wooden building in Westland. It was built in the 1860s as a hotel and converted to a general store in the 1890s which operated for over 60 years. It is now a Category 1 listed historic place.

== History ==
The Donovan's Store building was originally the Club Hotel, built on The Strand in 1865 or 1866 during the gold mining rush at Ōkārito. The hotel was converted to a general store in the 1890s and run by James Donovan (1867–1960) and his wife Eva Donovan for about 60 years. As well as the Ōkārito port the store serviced the gold dredge workers and flax cutters and Donovan was known for delivering supplies to isolated gold prospectors. The store mainly sold foodstuffs but many household and other items were sold such as fabric and tools.

Donovan ran the store until the 1950s, selling it to Keith (Robbie) Robertson of Whataroa who ran the store part–time until 1965. In 1987 the building was bequeathed to the Historic Places Trust by Robertson. The Trust passed the building to the Department of Conservation (DOC) in 1988. In 1990 the Trust gave the store a Category 1 listing, which designated it as a significant building meriting preservation. It fell into disrepair but the local community decided in the 1990s to restore it to a usable building, with a library premises being one of the possible uses and in 1994 DOC began a five-year restoration programme. The Ōkārito Community Association contributed $100,000 towards the renovation. It owns and maintains the hall in partnership with DOC.

In the 1990s the grounds surrounding the store were surveyed by botanist Elizabeth Woods who found roses, a holly tree, grapevine, oak tree and a mixture of other plants.

In 2009, the governor-general, Anand Satyanand, visited the store while on the West Coast.

== Construction ==
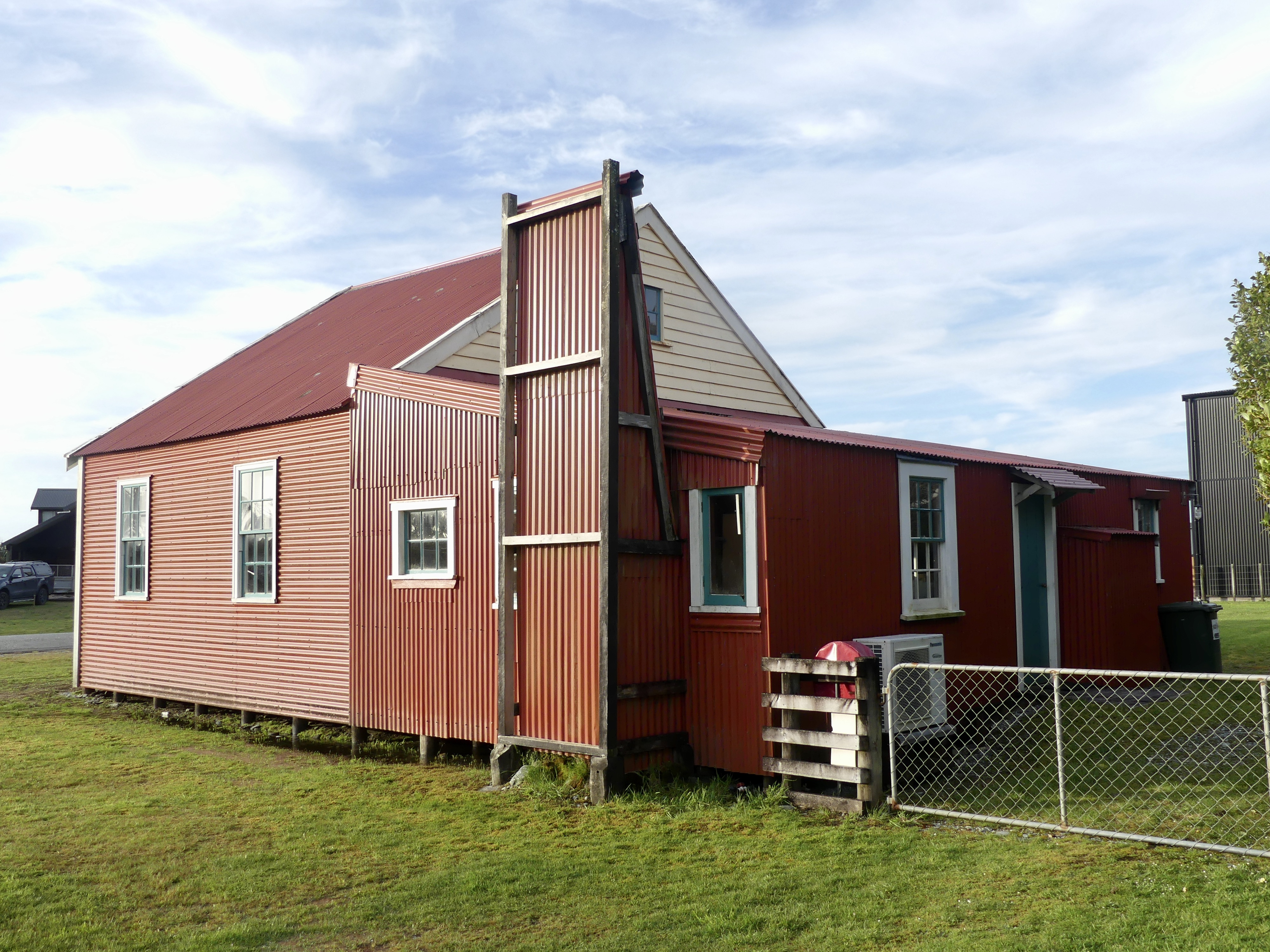
Rear view of Donovan's Store, October 2020

The front part of the building is the oldest with a lean-to at the back added later. Reconstruction work on the store showed it was built with a mixture of native timbers including kauri, rimu, kahikatea and imported Baltic pine, the latter possibly scavenged from shipwrecks. The sides and back of the building are clad in corrugated iron.

== Current status ==
Since 1990 the building has been registered by Heritage New Zealand as a Category I structure, with registration number 5008.

The building is now used as the Ōkārito Community Library with some of the book stock supplied by the Westland District Library.
