= Lake Mapourika =

Lake in New Zealand

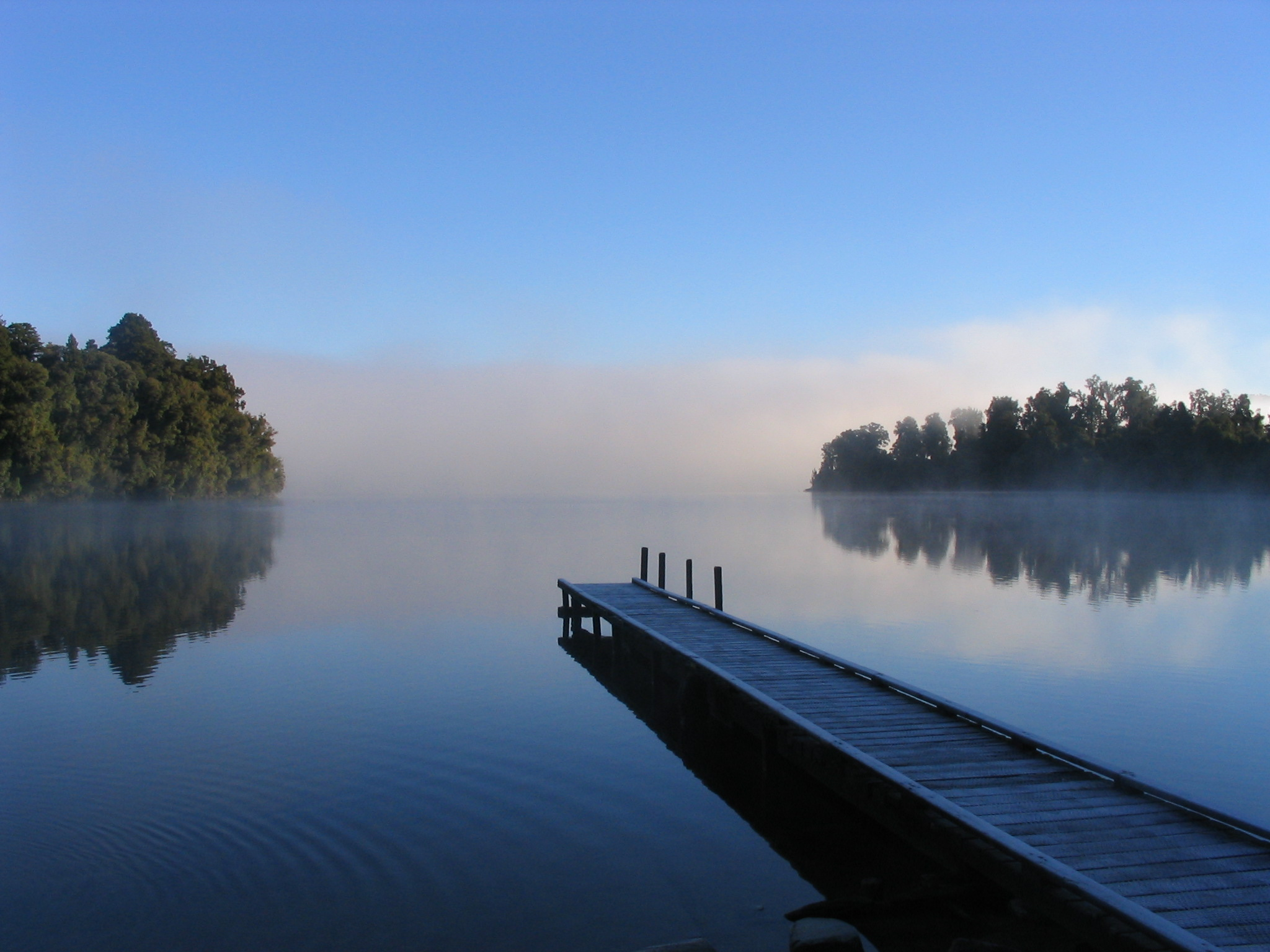
- Lake Mapourika

- Location within New Zealand
- Interactive map of Lake Mapourika
- Location: Westland District, West Coast Region, South Island
- Coordinates: 43°19′S 170°12′E
- Basin countries: New Zealand

Lake Mapourika is located on the West Coast of New Zealand's South Island. It lies north of Franz Josef Glacier, and the out-flowing Ōkārito River drains it into the Ōkārito Lagoon. It is the 3rd largest of the West Coast lakes, a glacier formation from the last ice age. Since the water from glacial melts no longer drains into the lake, it is filled with fresh rain water which runs through the surrounding forest floor, collecting tannins, giving it its dark colour. As the winds of the region sweep high above the mountains of the Southern Alps, the water is left unruffled and quite reflective of the forest on the lake fringes.

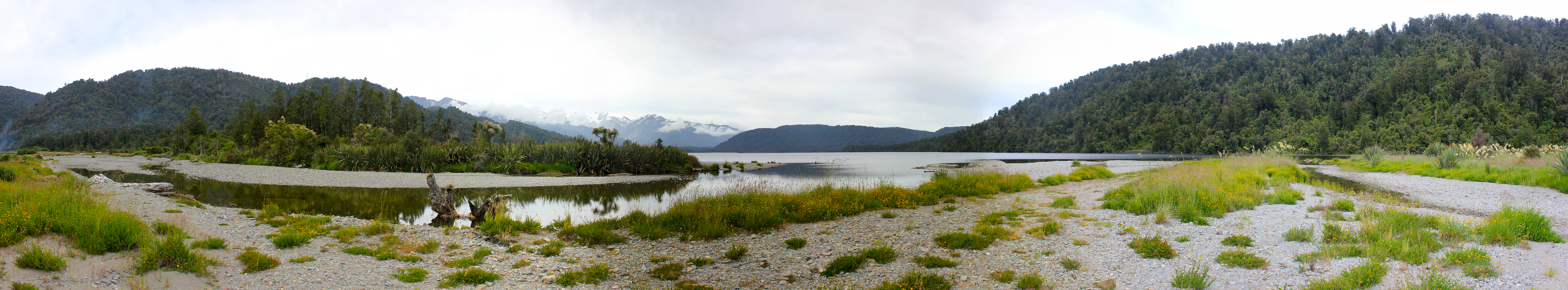
Lake Mapourika
