= Ōkārito River =

River in New Zealand

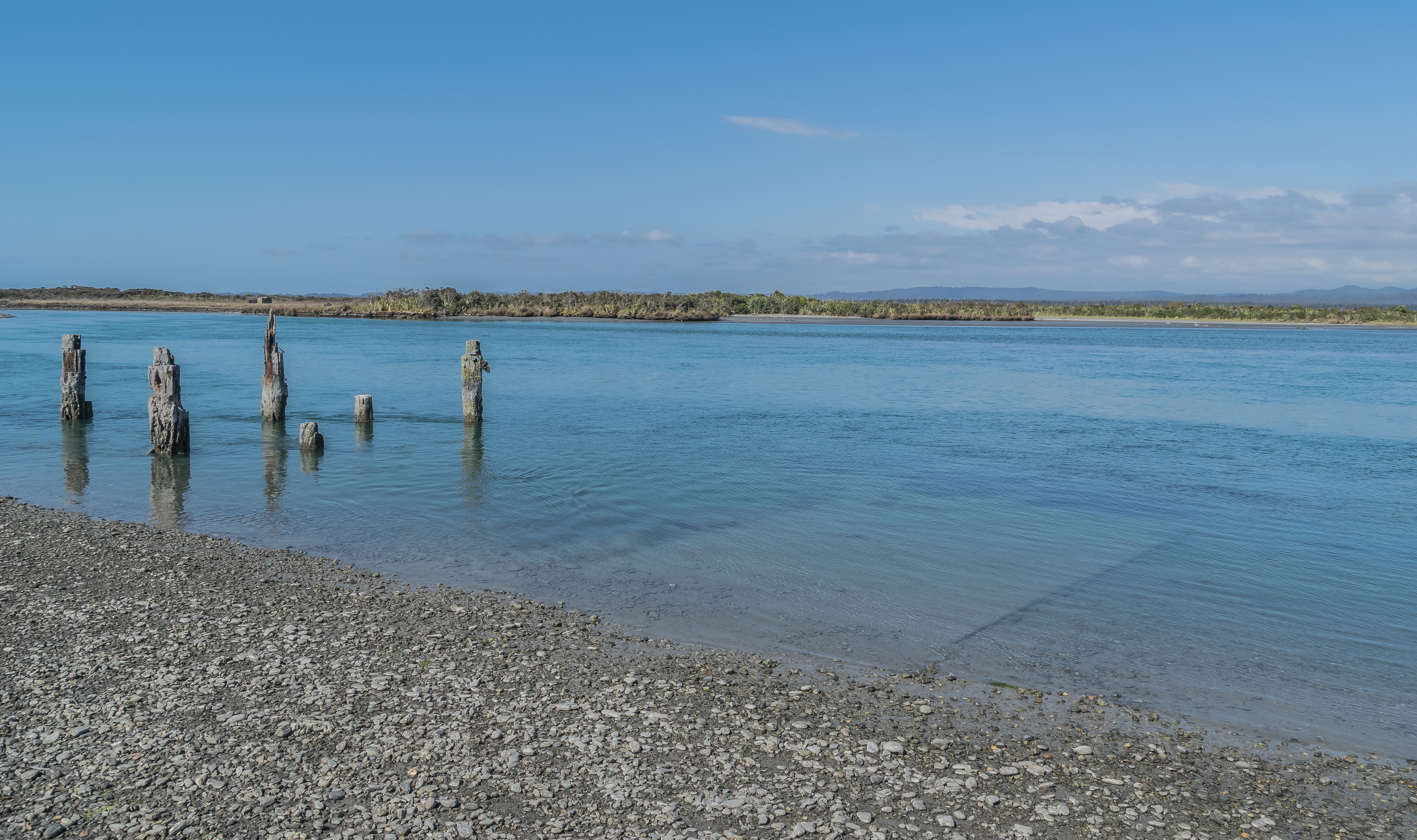
- Route of the Ōkārito River
- Mouth of the Ōkārito River Ōkārito River (New Zealand)

Location
- Country: New Zealand
- Region: West Coast
- District: Westland

Physical characteristics
- Source: Lake Mapourika
  - coordinates: 43.29267°S 170.21976°E
  - elevation: 82 m (269 ft)
- Mouth: Ōkārito Lagoon
  - coordinates: 43°13′09″S 170°09′45″E
  - elevation: 0 m (0 ft)
- Length: 12 kilometres (7.5 mi)

Basin features
- Progression: Lake Mapourika → Ōkārito River → Ōkārito Lagoon → Tasman Sea
- River system: Ōkārito River
- Tributaries
  - left: Jenkins Creek
  - right: Zalas Creek

The Ōkārito River is a river of the West Coast Region of New Zealand's South Island. It flows northwest from the northern end of Lake Mapourika, reaching the Ōkārito Lagoon 15 kilometres west of Whataroa.

== See also ==
- List of rivers of New Zealand
