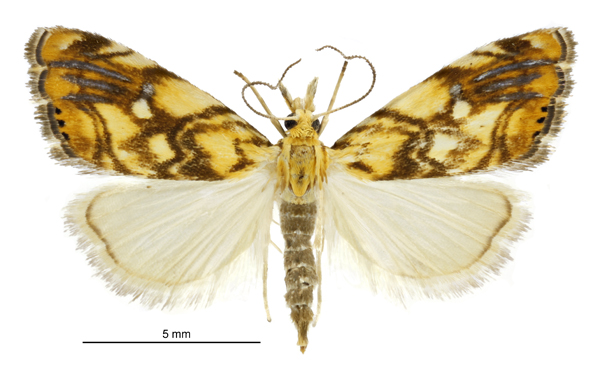
- Female
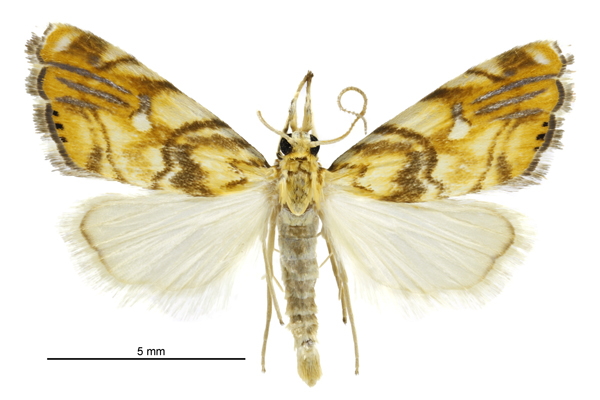
- Male

Scientific classification
- Kingdom: Animalia
- Phylum: Arthropoda
- Clade: Pancrustacea
- Class: Insecta
- Order: Lepidoptera
- Family: Crambidae
- Subfamily: Crambinae
- Tribe: Diptychophorini
- Genus: Glaucocharis
- Species: G. selenaea

Binomial name
- Glaucocharis selenaea (Meyrick, 1885)

Synonyms
- Diptychophora selenaea Meyrick, 1885; Pareromene selenaea (Meyrick, 1885)

= Glaucocharis selenaea =

Species of moth endemic to New Zealand

Glaucocharis selenaea is a moth in the family Crambidae. It was first described by Edward Meyrick in 1885. It is endemic to New Zealand and is found throughout the country from Manawatāwhi / Three Kings Islands to Southland including the Little Barrier and Great Barrier Islands. It inhabits native forest from lowland to subalpine altitudes. Larvae of Glaucocharis species feed on mosses and liverworts. Adults are on the wing from October until January and are attracted to light. It can be distinguished from the similar appearing G. metallifera as G. selenaea is smaller in size, the diagonal shaped band, the small round white discal spot and the black-marked veins in the near the end of the forewings.

== Taxonomy ==
This species was first described by Edward Meyrick using specimens collected at Otira Gorge and Dunedin and named Diptychophora selenaea. Meyrick gave a fuller description of this moth later in 1885. George Hudson discussed and illustrated this species under that name in his 1928 book The butterflies and moths of New Zealand. In 1929 Alfred Philpott studied and illustrated the male genitalia of this species, however he mislabelled the illustrations in his publication. The genitalia illustration labelled Diptychophora interrupta are those of this species. In 1971 David Edward Gaskin placed this species in the genus Pareromene. However, in 1985 Gaskin recognised that Glaucocharis must take precedence over Pareromene and placed G. selenaea into that genus. The female lectotype, collected in Dunedin by A. Purdie, is held at the Natural History Museum, London.

== Description ==
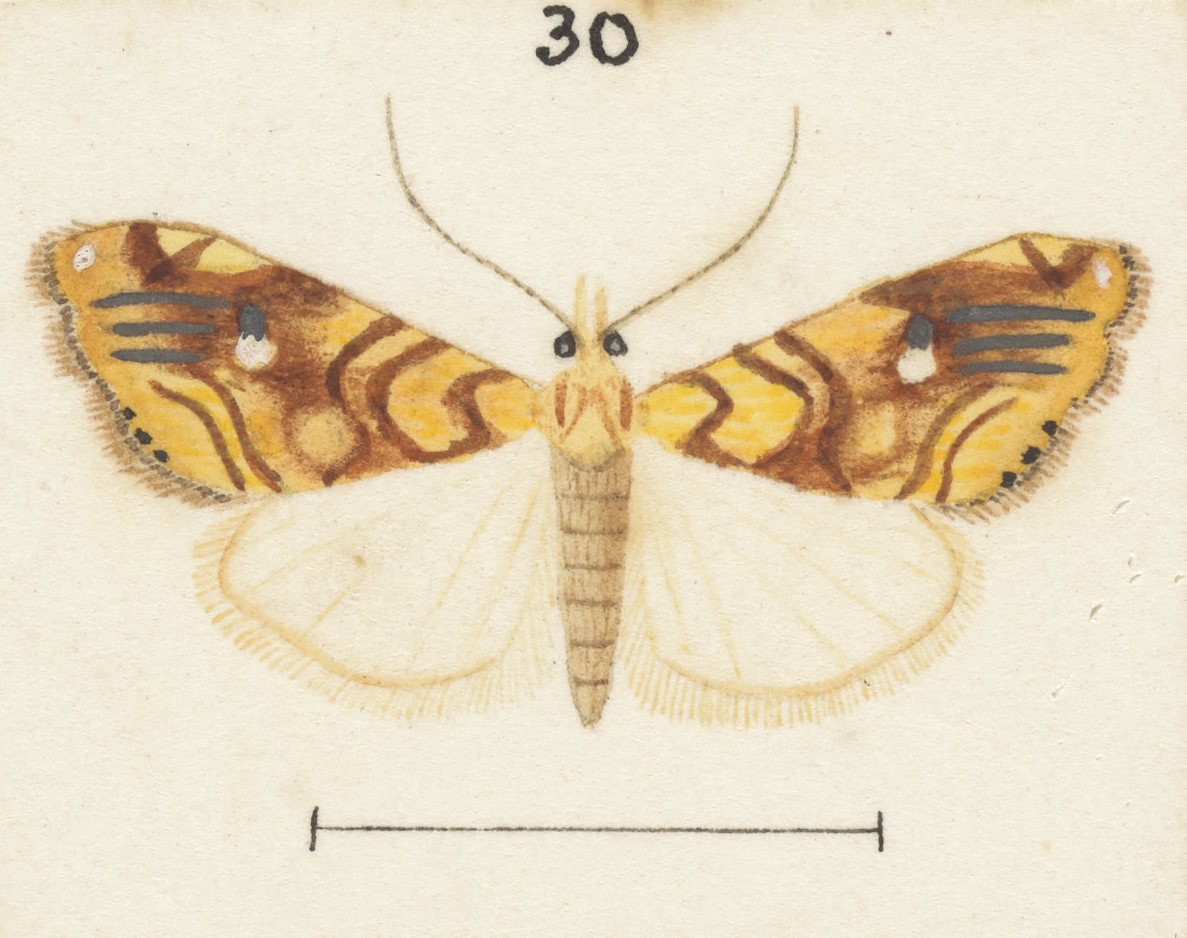
Illustration by Hudson.

Hudson described G. selenaea as follows:

The expansion of the wings is barely 5/8 inch. The fore-wings are orange yellow, with rich orange-brown markings; there is a very short transverse line at the base, a double angulated transverse line at 1/4, a double interrupted wavy transverse line at 3/4, a broad diagonal shaded band extending from slightly below the apex to the dorsum at about 1/4; there is a small round white spot near the middle of the wing, with an elongate leaden metallic mark above it; between this and the termen are three horizontal leaden metallic streaks; the termen is finely edged with black, and there are three small black spots just before the tornus; the cilia are golden, barred with brown. The hind-wings are very pale yellow, the termen finely edged with very pale yellowish-brown.

Specimens of this species can vary in the depth of colour of the ground-colour of the forewings and in the extent of the diagonal band. Hudson pointed out that G. selenaea can be distinguished from the similar appearing G. metallifera by the smaller size of G. selenaea, the diagonal shaped band and the small round white discal spot on its forewings. Gaskin stated that the black-marked veins in the subterminal region of the forewings is also diagnostic.

== Distribution ==
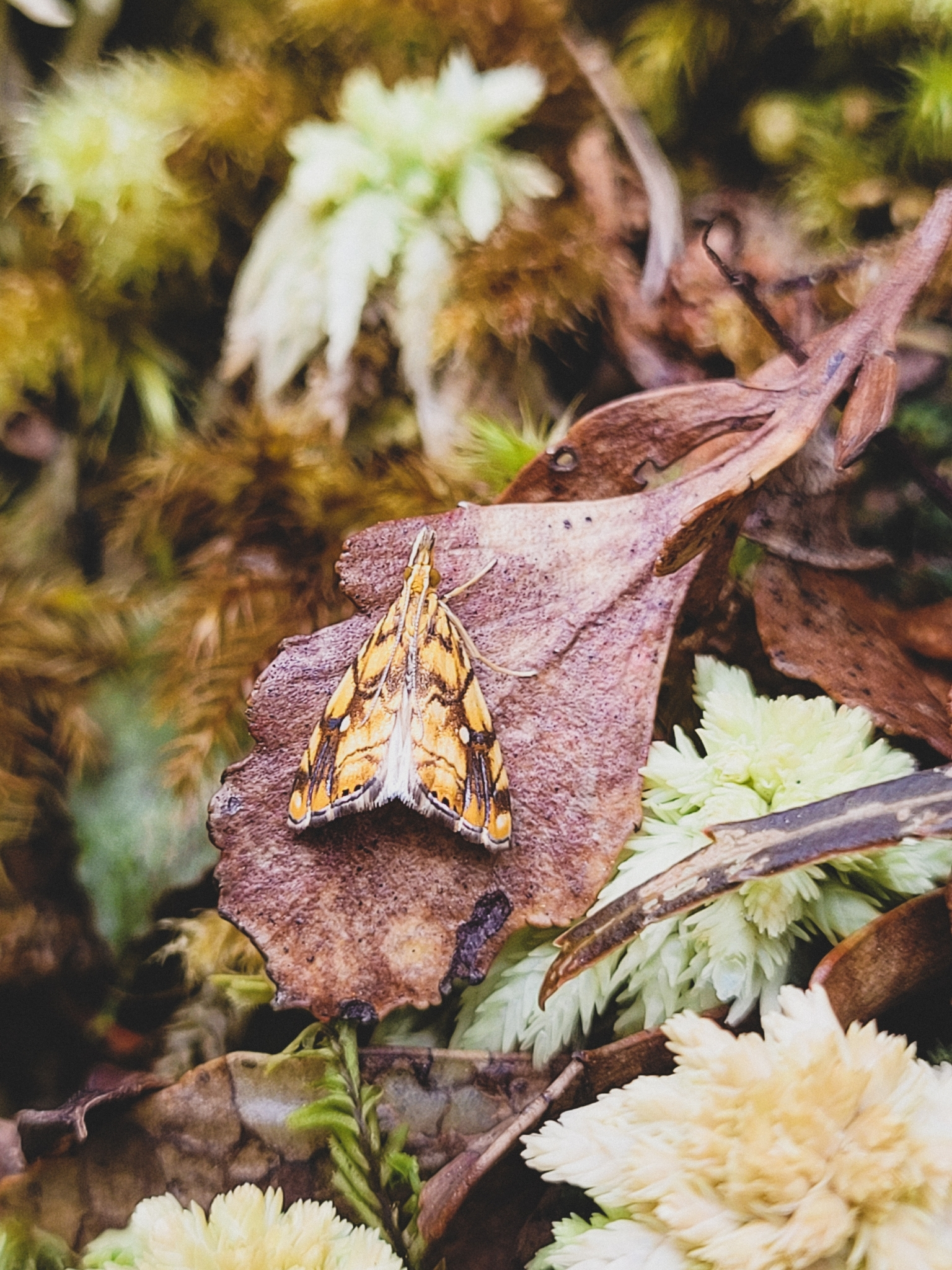
Live specimen of G. selenaea.

It is endemic to New Zealand. It is generally distributed throughout the country from Three Kings Islands to Southland. It has also been observed on both the Little Barrier and Great Barrier Islands.

== Habitat and hosts ==
This species inhabits native forest from lowland to subalpine altitudes. Larvae of Glaucocharis species feed on mosses and liverworts.

== Behaviour ==
Adults are on the wing from October until January and are attracted to light.
