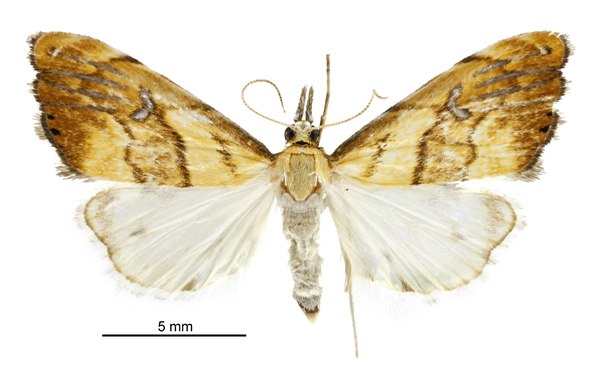
- Female
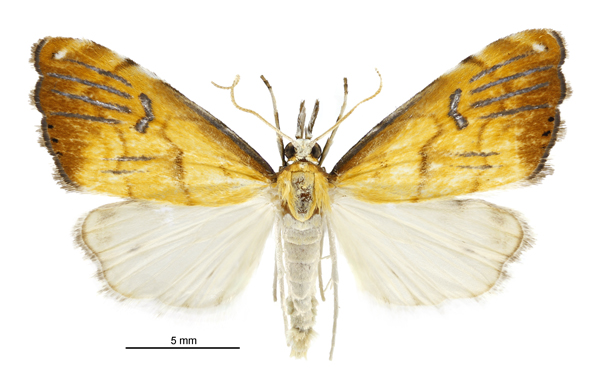
- Male

Scientific classification
- Kingdom: Animalia
- Phylum: Arthropoda
- Clade: Pancrustacea
- Class: Insecta
- Order: Lepidoptera
- Family: Crambidae
- Subfamily: Crambinae
- Tribe: Diptychophorini
- Genus: Glaucocharis
- Species: G. metallifera

Binomial name
- Glaucocharis metallifera (Butler, 1877)

Synonyms
- Eromene metallifera Butler, 1877; Diptychophora metallifera (Butler, 1877); Pareromene metallifera (Butler, 1877)

= Glaucocharis metallifera =

Species of moth endemic to New Zealand

Glaucocharis metallifera is a moth of the family Crambidae. It was first described by Arthur Gardiner Butler in 1877. It is endemic to New Zealand and is found in the southern half of the North Island and the northern half of the South Island. It inhabits native forest at lowland and subalpine altitudes and frequents banks of streams flowing through dense forest clad valleys. The larval host is moss and the larvae are very active and live in galleries in wet moss, on logs or stones in the forest. Adults are on the wing from October to February. It has been hypothesised that this species has two broods per year. Adults have been collected via netting at dusk.

== Taxonomy ==
This species was first described by Arthur Gardiner Butler in 1877 using specimens collected in Dunedin by James Hector and originally named Eromene metallifera. Edward Meyrick placed this species in the genus Diptychophora in 1883. George Hudson discussed and illustrated this species in his 1928 book The butterflies and moths of New Zealand under that name. In 1929 Alfred Philpott described the genitalia of the male of this species. In 1971 David Edward Gaskin placed this species in the genus Pareromene. However in 1985 Gaskin recognised that Glaucocharis must take precedence over Pareromene and placed G. metallifera into that genus. The male holotype specimen is held at the Natural History Museum, London.

== Description ==
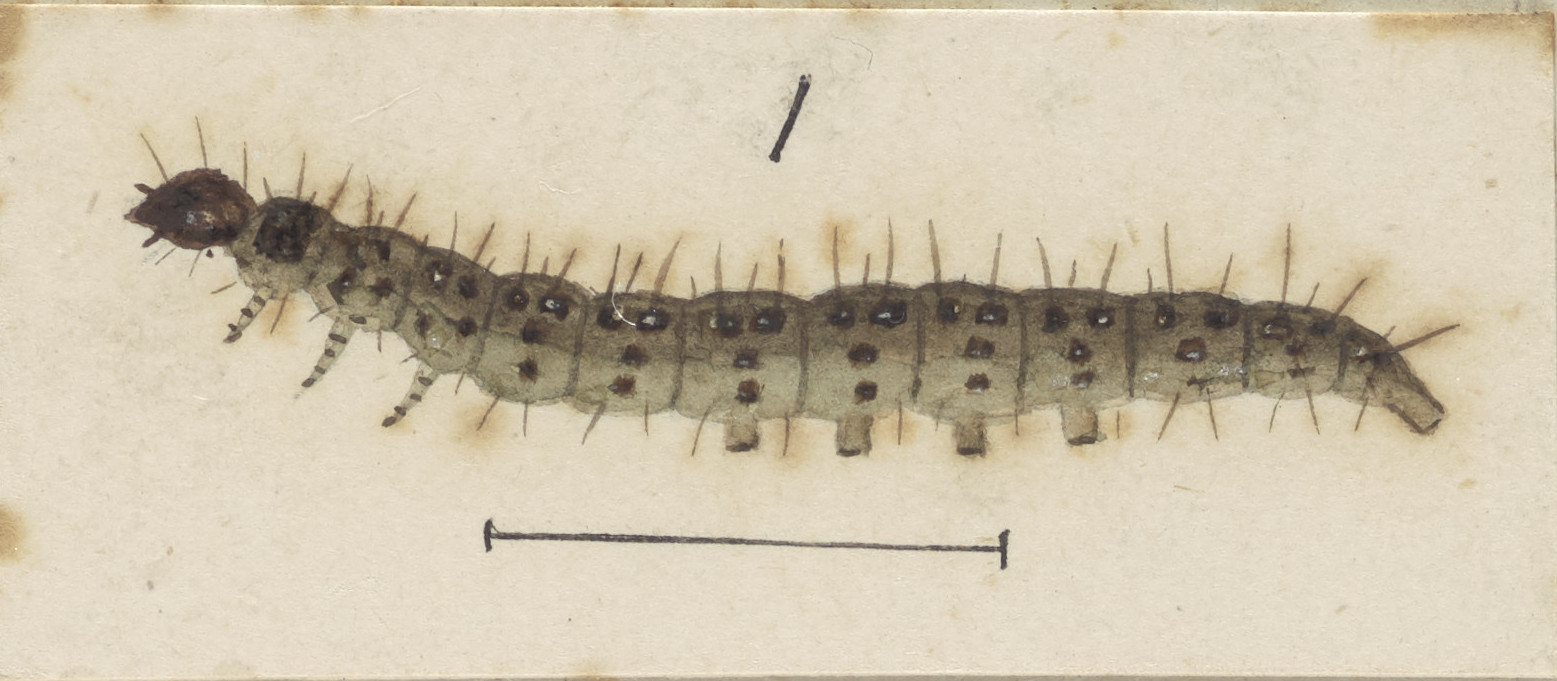
Larvae of G. metallifera

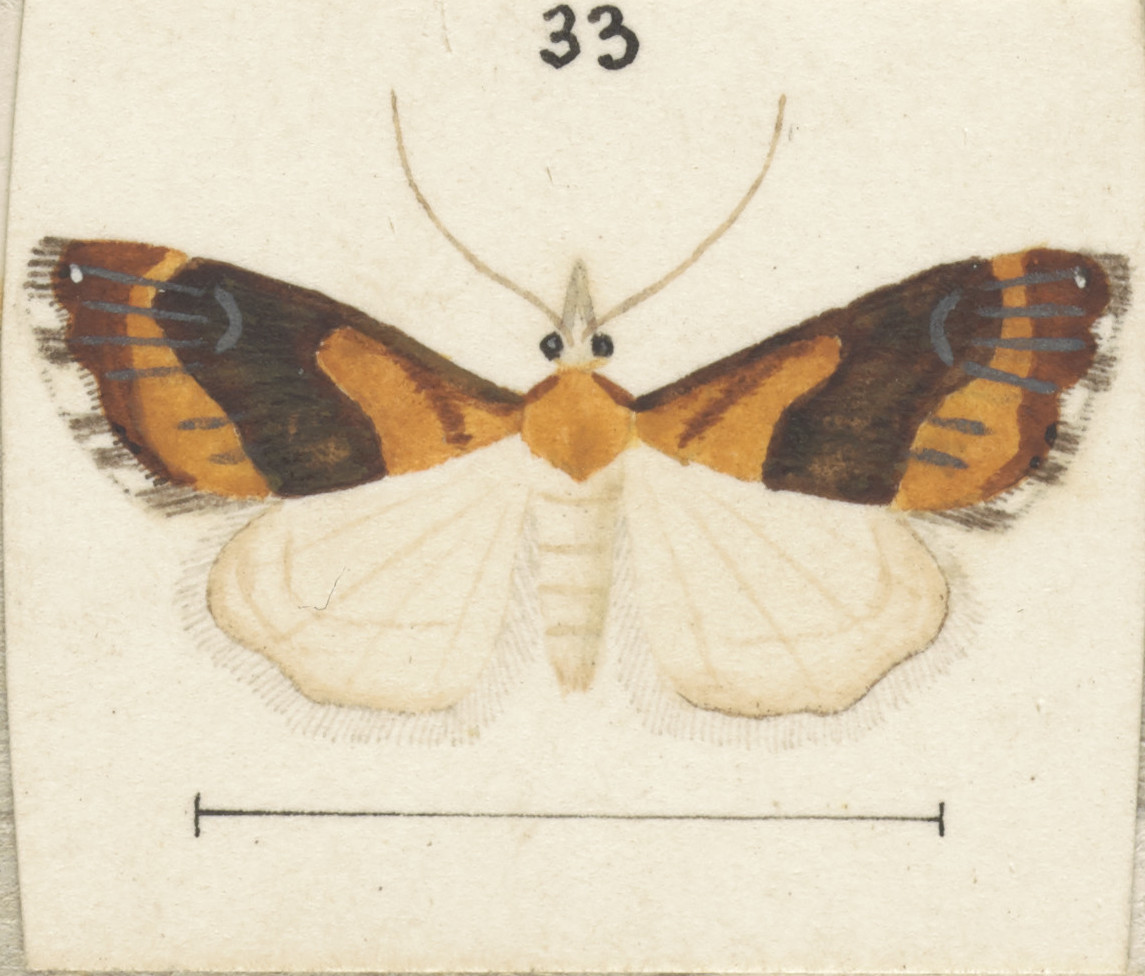
Female variety.

Hudson states the larvae of G. metallifera is similar in appearance to that of G. microdora but is stouter, more shining and glassy-looking.

Hudson described the adults of this species as follows:

The expansion of the wings is about 7/8 inch. The fore-wings are rich orange-yellow becoming ordnge-brown towards the termen; there is a brown shade on the costa, a strongly curved transverse line at about 1/3 and another, very wavy transverse line at about 2/3; there is a large metallic, crescentic mark in the middle of the wing; four horizontal leaden metallic stripes between the crescent and the termen and two fainter stripes near the tornus; the termen itself is edged with metallic lead colour; there are three minute black dots on the termen before the tornus; the cilia are snow-white, strongly barred with brown. The hind-wings are pale ochreous-yellow with a fine terminal brown line, and occasionally a faint transverse line near the middle. The cilia are white.

Hudson points out that in some specimens the whole of the space on the forewings between the transverse lines is filled in with rich brown and the costa is broadly margined with brown near the base.

== Distribution ==
This species is endemic to New Zealand. It occurs in the southern half of the North Island and the northern half of the South Island.

== Habitat and hosts ==
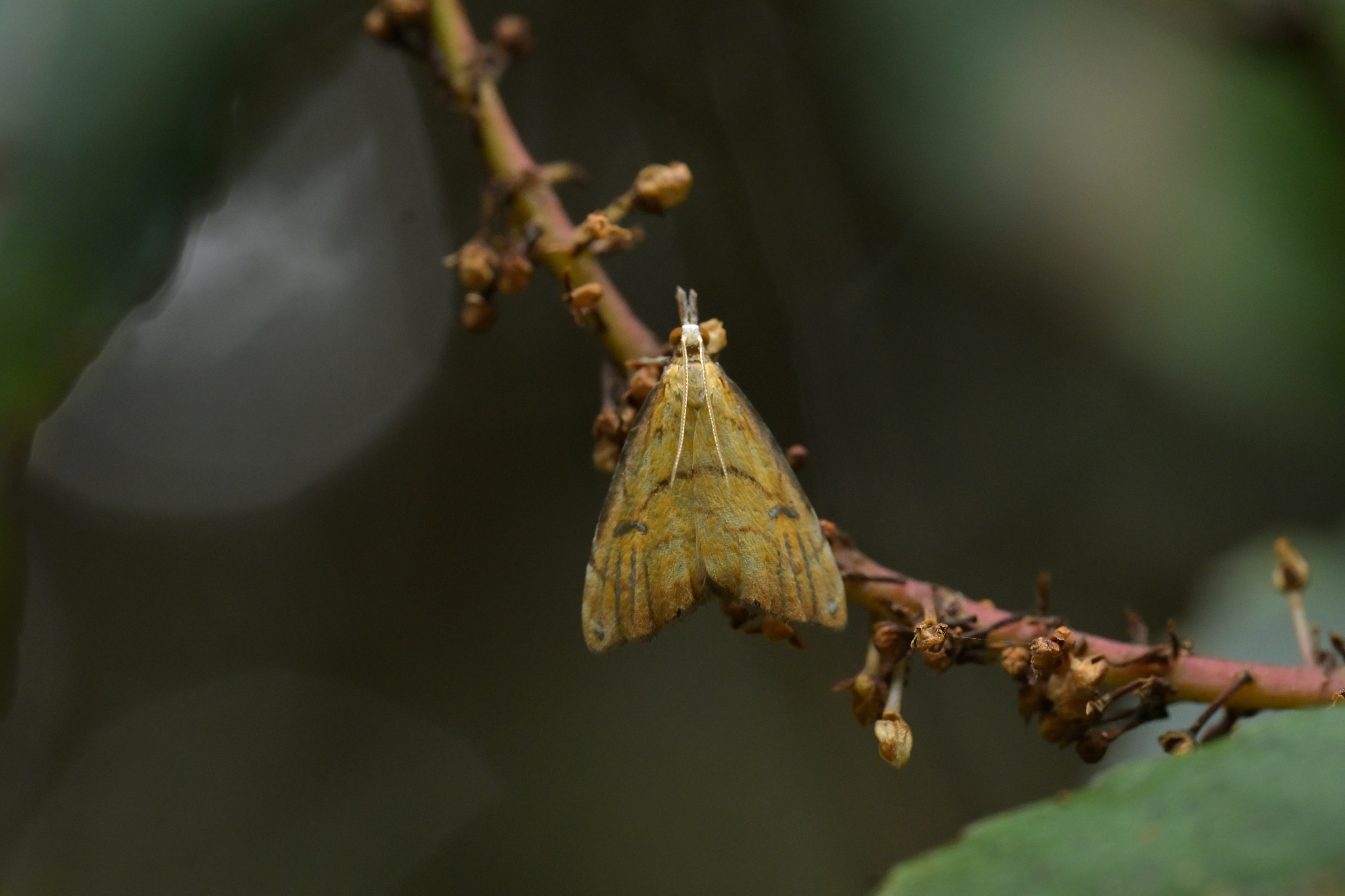
Living specimen.

This species inhabits native forest at lowland and subalpine altitudes and frequents banks of streams flowing through dense forest clad valleys. Hudson stated that the larval host was moss.

== Behaviour ==
The larvae of this species is very active and lives in galleries in wet moss, on logs or stones in the forest. Adults are on the wing from October to February. It has been hypothesised that this species has two broods per year. Adults have been collected via netting at dusk.
