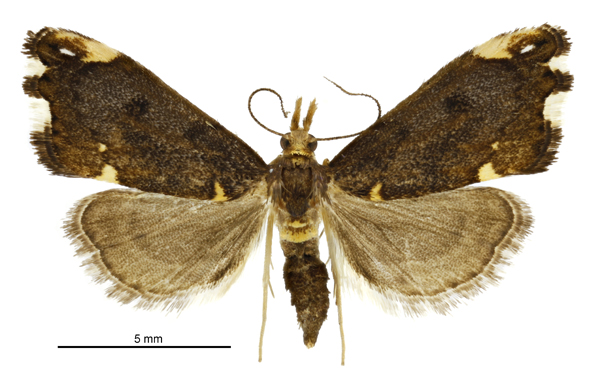

Scientific classification
- Kingdom: Animalia
- Phylum: Arthropoda
- Clade: Pancrustacea
- Class: Insecta
- Order: Lepidoptera
- Family: Crambidae
- Subfamily: Crambinae
- Tribe: Diptychophorini
- Genus: Glaucocharis
- Species: G. pyrsophanes

Binomial name
- Glaucocharis pyrsophanes (Meyrick, 1882)

Synonyms
- Diptychophora pyrsophanes Meyrick, 1882; Pareromene pyrsophanes (Meyrick, 1882)

= Glaucocharis pyrsophanes =

Species of moth endemic to New Zealand

Glaucocharis pyrsophanes is a moth in the family Crambidae. It was described by Edward Meyrick in 1882. It is endemic to New Zealand and is found throughout the country including the North, South and Stewart Islands. It inhabits native forest from lowland and subalpine altitudes. It is said to be common in sunny but damp forest openings. Larvae of Glaucocharis species feed on mosses and liverworts. Adults are on the wing from October until February. They are known to feed from and pollinate Leptospermum scoparium and Helichrysum selago.

== Taxonomy ==
This species was first described by Edward Meyrick in 1882 and named Diptychophora pyrsophanes. Meyrick gave a fuller description of this species in 1883. George Hudson discussed and illustrated this species under that name in his 1928 book The butterflies and moths of New Zealand. In 1971 David Edward Gaskin placed this species in the genus Pareromene. However, in 1985 Gaskin recognised that Glaucocharis must take precedence over Pareromene and placed G. pyrsophanes into that genus. The female lectotype, collected at the Wellington Botanic Garden by Meyrick, is held at the Natural History Museum, London.

== Description ==
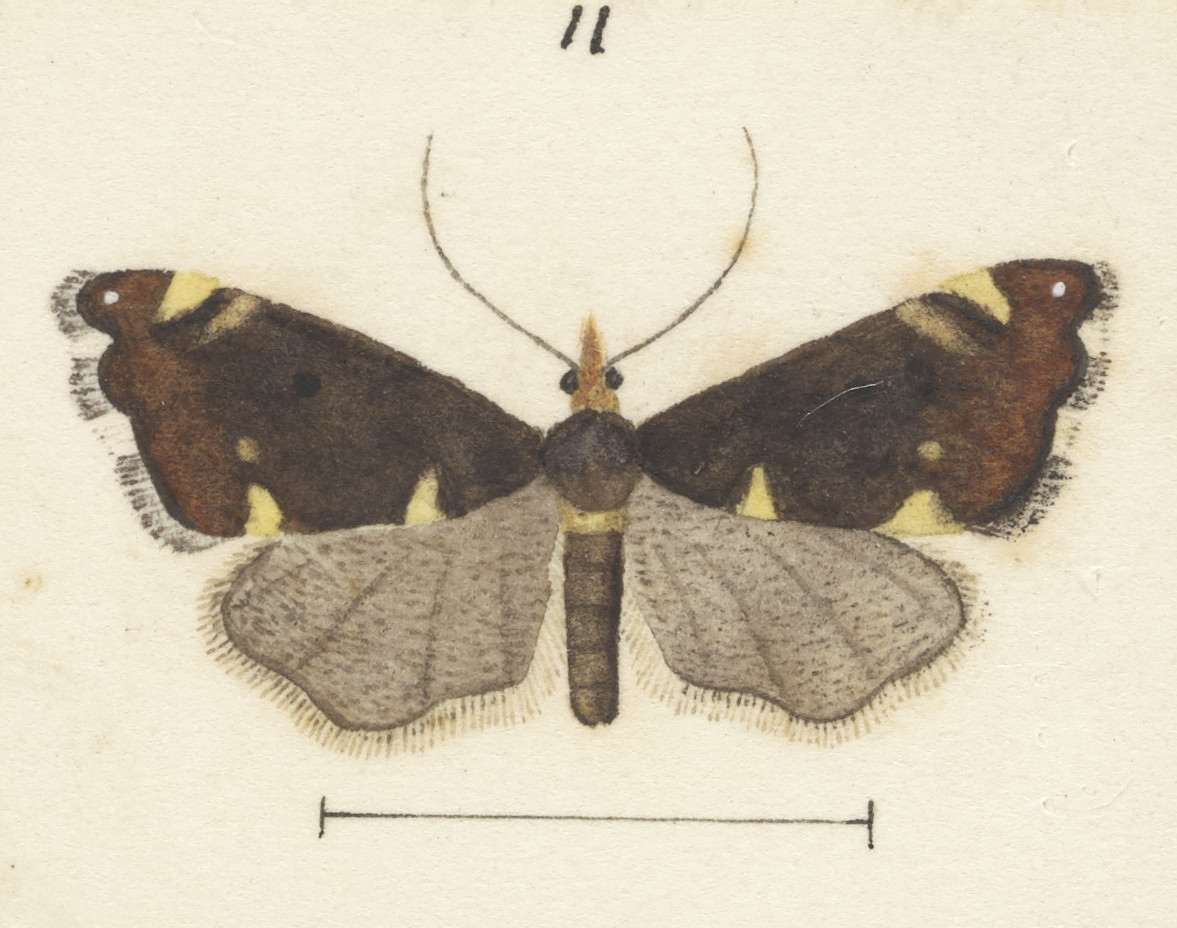
Illustration by Hudson.

Meyrick described this species as follows:

Male, female. — 13 1/2-16 mm. Head ochreous or brownish - ochreous. Palpi light yellowish-ochreous, externally more brownish. Antennae dark fuscous. Thorax rather dark purplish-fuscous. Abdomen dark purplish-fuscous, with a light yellowish ring near base. Legs clear whitish-ochreous. Forewings triangular, very broad posteriorly, costa very gently arched, apex rounded, hindmargin oblique, indentations moderately deep; ochreous-brown, almost wholly suffused with dark purplish-fuscous except narrowly along hindmargin and more broadly at apex and anal angle, and finely irrorated with grey, especially towards costa and disc beyond middle; a very small triangular yellow spot on inner margin at 1/4; an equally small rather subquadrate yellow spot on inner margin at 3/4, with a pale yellow dot rather above and beyond its apex; a very faintly perceptible darker transverse line from costa at 1/4 to first dorsal spot, sharply angulated outwards beneath costa; a suffused darker spot in disc above and beyond middle; a small outwardly oblique triangular pale yellow spot on costa at 3/4, sometimes closely preceded by a faint oblique yellowish costal mark; a very small suffused pale yellowish spot on costa before apex; a dark fuscous dot in apex, preceded by a clear white dot; sometimes a white dot on hind margin in upper indentation; a slender dark fuscous hindmarginal line : cilia whitish ochreous, with a dark grey line near base, on indentations wholly clear white, a dark grey spot at apex, another between indentations, a third above anal angle, a fourth on anal angle. Hindwings fuscous-grey, with a very indistinct darker line posteriorly; a dark fuscous hindmarginal line; cilia grey- whitish, with a grey line near base.

This species is easily distinguished from similar appearing species in this genus as a result of its larger size and also its forewing pattern. Unlike G. planetopa it does not have an oval silvery kidney shaped patch on the forewings nor, unlike G. microdora, does it have the large yellow sigma shape on the first forewing line. G. pyrosphanes can also be distinguished from G. microdora as it has broad white bars on the cilia of its fore-wings unlike the latter species.

Hudson states that this species can vary in the intensity of ground colour and the extent and number of yellow markings. He pointes out that South Island specimens tend to be paler with a more slaty hue to their forewings and smaller yellow markings.

== Distribution ==
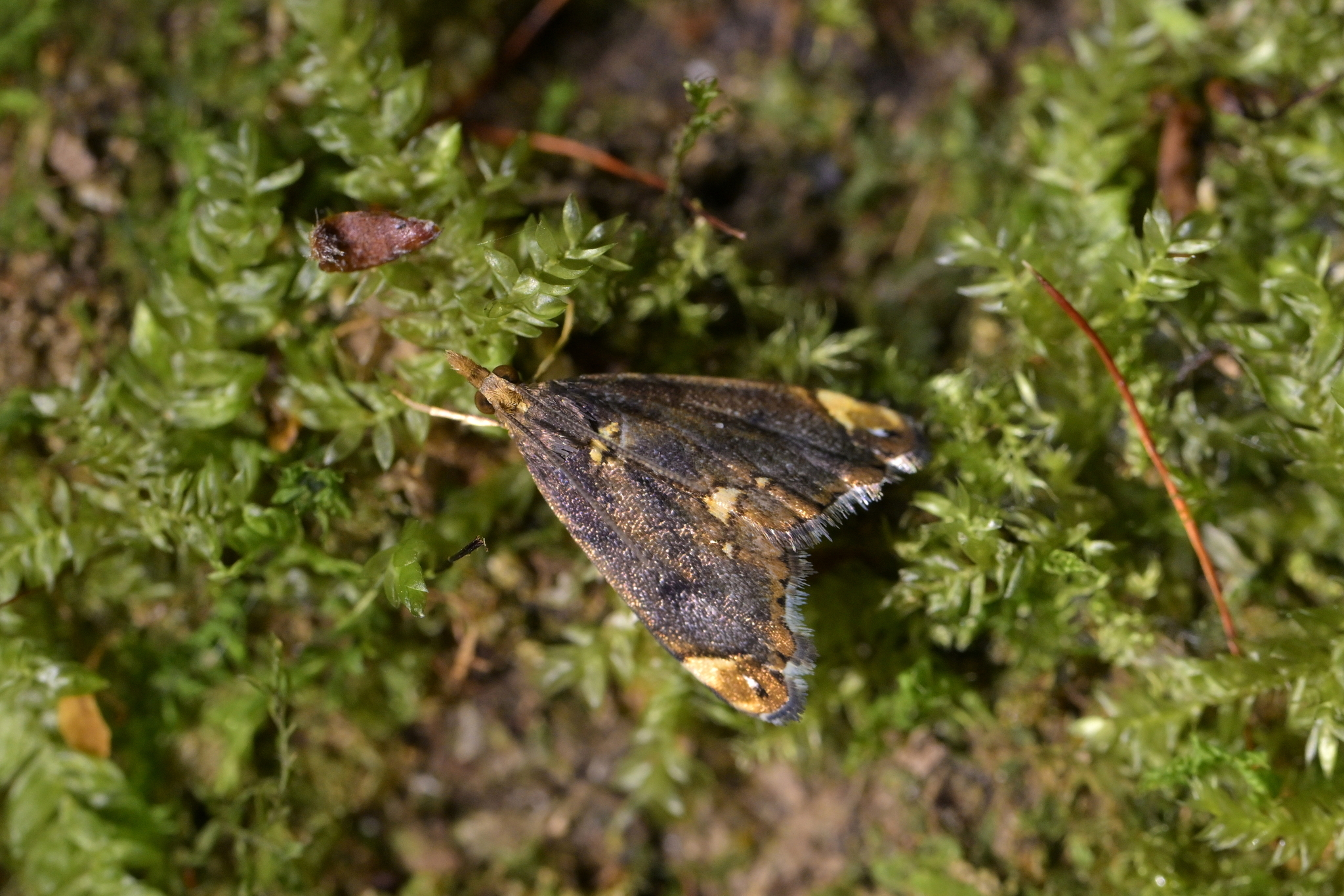
Live G. pyrsophanes.

This species is endemic to New Zealand. This species is common and generally distributed throughout the country including Stewart Island.

== Habitat and hosts ==
G. pyrsophanes inhabits lowland to subalpine native forest. It can be common in openings in forest particularly if they are damp but sunny. Larvae of Glaucocharis species feed on mosses and liverworts. Adults of this moth are known to feed from and pollinate Leptospermum scoparium and Helichrysum selago.

== Behaviour ==
Adults are on the wing from late October until February. When in flight this species is difficult to see as a result of its dark colouring and dizzying flight.
