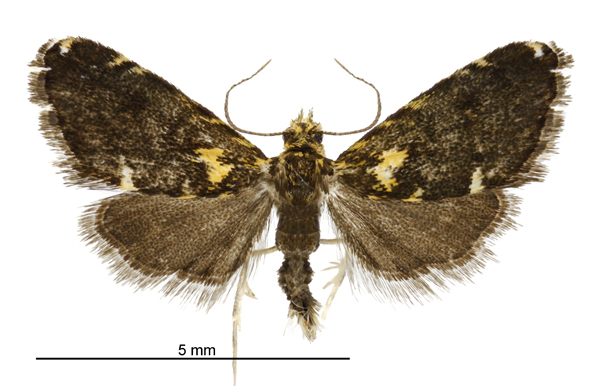
- Male

Scientific classification
- Kingdom: Animalia
- Phylum: Arthropoda
- Clade: Pancrustacea
- Class: Insecta
- Order: Lepidoptera
- Family: Crambidae
- Subfamily: Crambinae
- Tribe: Diptychophorini
- Genus: Glaucocharis
- Species: G. microdora

Binomial name
- Glaucocharis microdora (Meyrick, 1905)

Synonyms
- Diptychophora microdora Meyrick, 1905; Pareromene microdora (Meyrick, 1905)

= Glaucocharis microdora =

Species of moth endemic to New Zealand

Glaucocharis microdora is a moth of the family Crambidae. It was first described by Edward Meyrick in 1905. It is endemic to New Zealand and is found in the southern parts of the North Island and the north and central parts of the South Island. It inhabits native forest at lowland to subalpine altitudes. The larvae of this species feeds on moss and adults are on the wing from November until February. It is similar in appearance to G. pyrsophanes but can be distinguished as G. microdora is of a smaller size and has bright yellow markings. It also lacks the broad white bars on forewings of G. pyrophanes.

== Taxonomy ==
This species was first described by Edward Meyrick in 1905 using two specimens, one of which he collected on Mount Arthur at 3000 ft in January, and was named Diptychophora microdora. George Hudson discussed and illustrated this species under that name in his 1928 book The butterflies and moths of New Zealand. In 1929 Alfred Philpott studied the male genitalia of this species. In 1971 David Edward Gaskin placed this species in the genus Pareromene. However in 1985 Gaskin recognised that Glaucocharis must take precedence over Pareromene and placed G. microdora into that genus. The female lectotype specimen, collected on Flora Saddle, Mount Arthur by Meyrick, is held at the Natural History Museum, London.

== Description ==
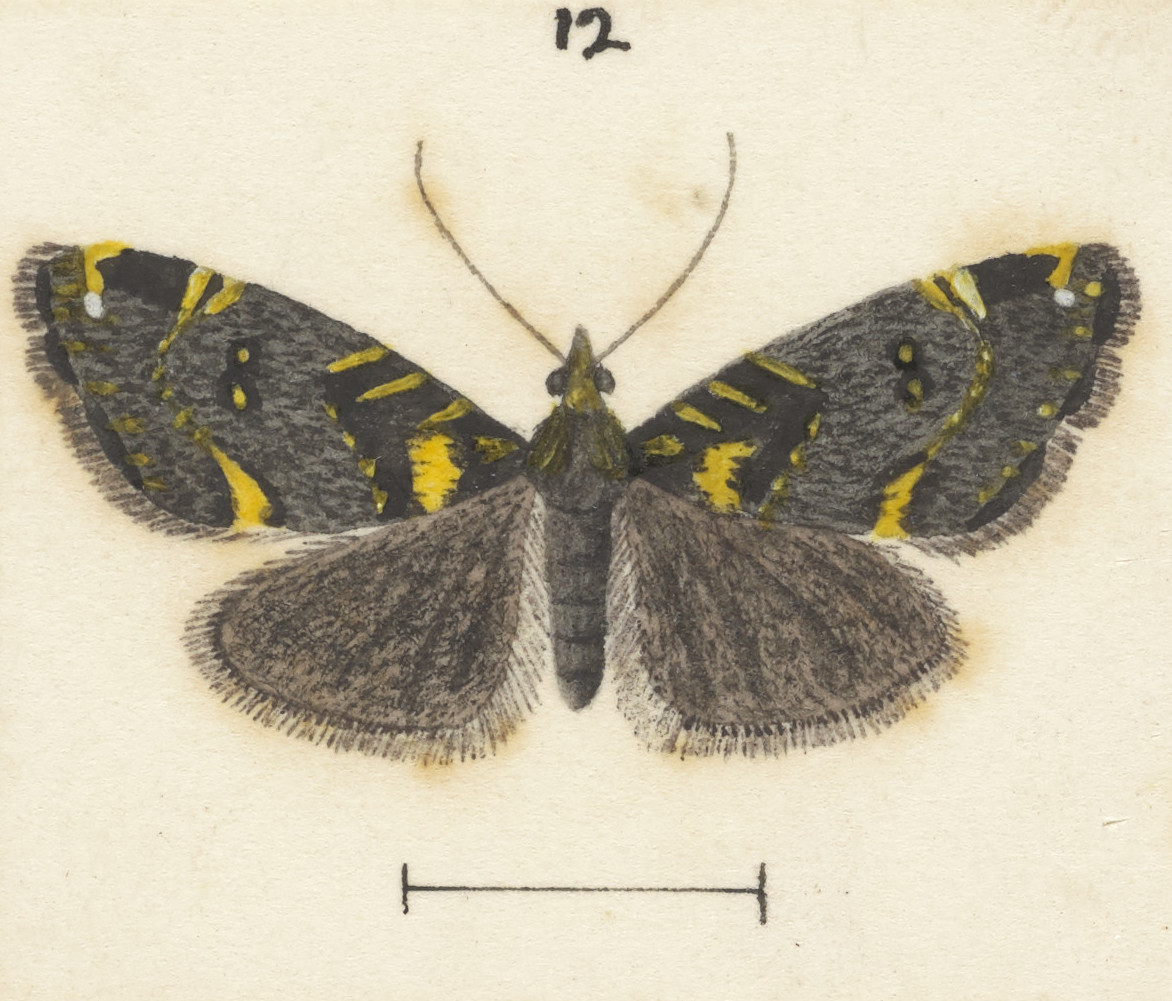
Illustration of female.

Hudson described the larvae of this species as follows:

The larva, which feeds on dry moss on fallen logs, is very slender, dull brownish-green; the head and second segment are horny, shining brownish-black; there is a double series of obscure tubereles on each segment, each tubercle emitting a black bristle.

Meyrick described this species as follows:

♂♀ . 10-12 mm. Head, palpi, antennae, thorax, and abdomen dark fuscous; palpi mixed with yellowish towards base. Fore-wings triangular, costa gently arched, apex obtuse, termen Insinuate, oblique, rounded beneath; dark fuscous, bronzy-tinged; first and second lines dark, angulated, edged on costa with yellow strigulae, first edged on dorsal half anteriorly by two confluent yellow spots and posteriorly by a yellow line, second edged posteriorly towards dorsum by a wedge-shaped yellow mark; a yellow costal strigula just before apex, terminated by a white dot; cilia dark grey, with an irregular white basal line round apex and upper part of termen (imperfect). Hind-wings and cilia dark fuscous.

G. microdora is similar in appearance to G. pyrsophanes but can be distinguished is G. mircodora is of a smaller size and has bright yellow markings. G. microdora also lacks the broad white bars on the cilia of the fore-wings which are present on G. pyrsophanes specimens.

== Distribution ==
This species is endemic to New Zealand. G. microdora is found in the southern parts of the North Island to the north and central parts of the South Island. However Charle E. Clarke stated in 1933 he took specimens in the Lakes Manapouri and Te Anau area.

== Habitat and hosts ==
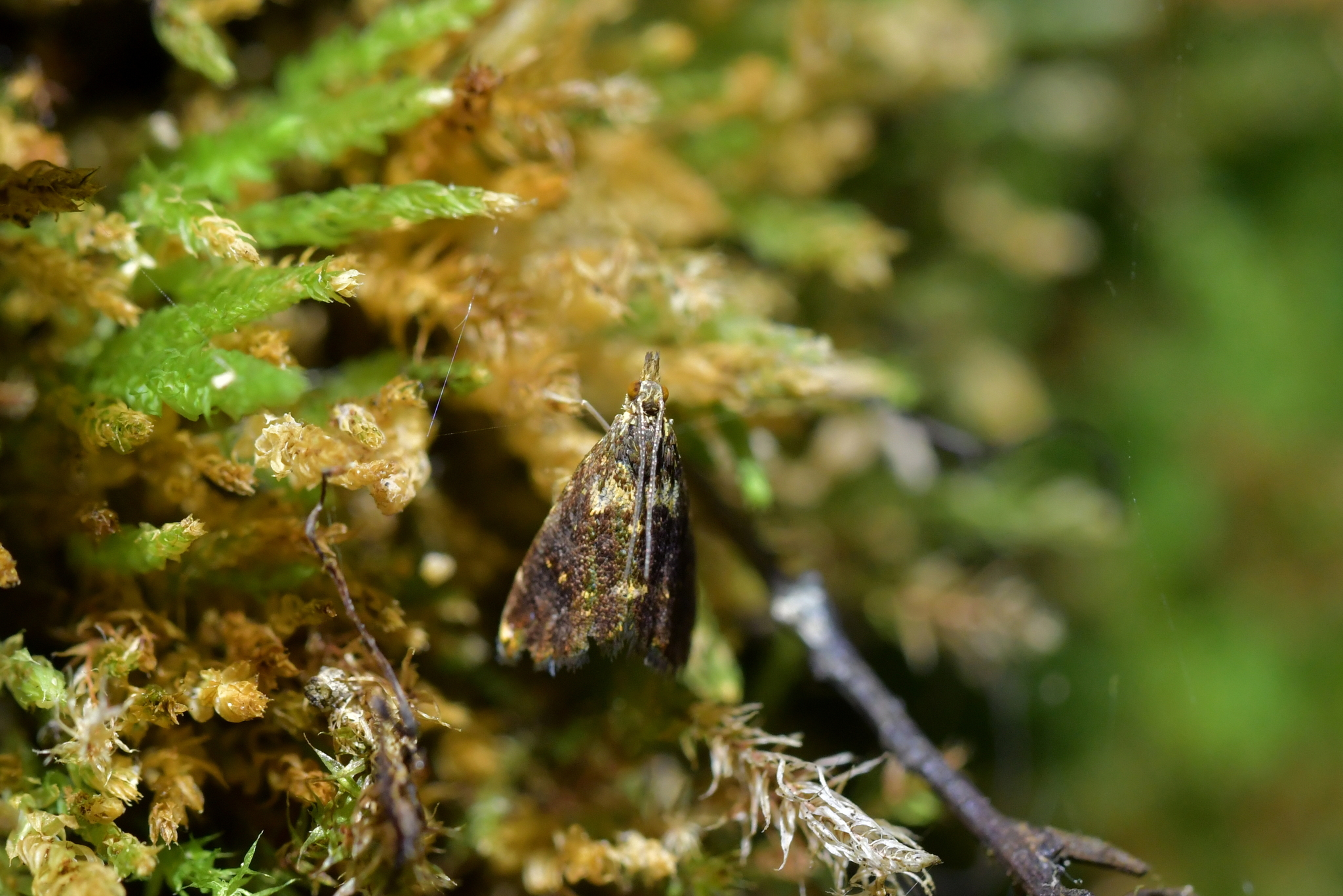
Live specimen.

G. microdora inhabits native forest at lowland to subalpine altitudes. The larvae of this species feed on moss.

== Behaviour ==
Adults of this species are on the wing from November to January.
